

119001–119100 

|-bgcolor=#d6d6d6
| 119001 ||  || — || December 30, 2000 || Socorro || LINEAR || — || align=right | 5.4 km || 
|-id=002 bgcolor=#d6d6d6
| 119002 ||  || — || December 30, 2000 || Socorro || LINEAR || — || align=right | 9.7 km || 
|-id=003 bgcolor=#E9E9E9
| 119003 ||  || — || December 30, 2000 || Socorro || LINEAR || — || align=right | 3.0 km || 
|-id=004 bgcolor=#d6d6d6
| 119004 ||  || — || December 30, 2000 || Socorro || LINEAR || THM || align=right | 5.2 km || 
|-id=005 bgcolor=#d6d6d6
| 119005 ||  || — || December 30, 2000 || Socorro || LINEAR || — || align=right | 6.2 km || 
|-id=006 bgcolor=#d6d6d6
| 119006 ||  || — || December 30, 2000 || Socorro || LINEAR || — || align=right | 6.5 km || 
|-id=007 bgcolor=#E9E9E9
| 119007 ||  || — || December 30, 2000 || Socorro || LINEAR || — || align=right | 3.8 km || 
|-id=008 bgcolor=#d6d6d6
| 119008 ||  || — || December 30, 2000 || Socorro || LINEAR || — || align=right | 7.6 km || 
|-id=009 bgcolor=#d6d6d6
| 119009 ||  || — || December 30, 2000 || Socorro || LINEAR || — || align=right | 5.2 km || 
|-id=010 bgcolor=#d6d6d6
| 119010 ||  || — || December 30, 2000 || Socorro || LINEAR || VER || align=right | 5.6 km || 
|-id=011 bgcolor=#d6d6d6
| 119011 ||  || — || December 30, 2000 || Socorro || LINEAR || — || align=right | 6.1 km || 
|-id=012 bgcolor=#fefefe
| 119012 ||  || — || December 28, 2000 || Socorro || LINEAR || H || align=right | 1.2 km || 
|-id=013 bgcolor=#d6d6d6
| 119013 ||  || — || December 22, 2000 || Socorro || LINEAR || — || align=right | 6.5 km || 
|-id=014 bgcolor=#d6d6d6
| 119014 ||  || — || December 28, 2000 || Haleakala || NEAT || — || align=right | 3.8 km || 
|-id=015 bgcolor=#d6d6d6
| 119015 ||  || — || December 23, 2000 || Socorro || LINEAR || TIR || align=right | 5.8 km || 
|-id=016 bgcolor=#d6d6d6
| 119016 ||  || — || January 2, 2001 || Socorro || LINEAR || — || align=right | 8.3 km || 
|-id=017 bgcolor=#d6d6d6
| 119017 ||  || — || January 5, 2001 || Socorro || LINEAR || EMA || align=right | 7.9 km || 
|-id=018 bgcolor=#fefefe
| 119018 ||  || — || January 5, 2001 || Socorro || LINEAR || H || align=right | 1.1 km || 
|-id=019 bgcolor=#d6d6d6
| 119019 ||  || — || January 5, 2001 || Socorro || LINEAR || — || align=right | 5.9 km || 
|-id=020 bgcolor=#d6d6d6
| 119020 ||  || — || January 5, 2001 || Socorro || LINEAR || — || align=right | 7.7 km || 
|-id=021 bgcolor=#d6d6d6
| 119021 ||  || — || January 4, 2001 || Anderson Mesa || LONEOS || EOS || align=right | 3.2 km || 
|-id=022 bgcolor=#fefefe
| 119022 ||  || — || January 15, 2001 || Socorro || LINEAR || H || align=right | 1.00 km || 
|-id=023 bgcolor=#fefefe
| 119023 ||  || — || January 18, 2001 || Socorro || LINEAR || H || align=right data-sort-value="0.99" | 990 m || 
|-id=024 bgcolor=#d6d6d6
| 119024 ||  || — || January 19, 2001 || Socorro || LINEAR || — || align=right | 5.2 km || 
|-id=025 bgcolor=#d6d6d6
| 119025 ||  || — || January 20, 2001 || Socorro || LINEAR || HYG || align=right | 5.2 km || 
|-id=026 bgcolor=#fefefe
| 119026 ||  || — || January 26, 2001 || Socorro || LINEAR || H || align=right | 1.2 km || 
|-id=027 bgcolor=#d6d6d6
| 119027 ||  || — || February 1, 2001 || Socorro || LINEAR || — || align=right | 6.6 km || 
|-id=028 bgcolor=#d6d6d6
| 119028 ||  || — || February 13, 2001 || Socorro || LINEAR || — || align=right | 4.6 km || 
|-id=029 bgcolor=#d6d6d6
| 119029 ||  || — || February 13, 2001 || Socorro || LINEAR || — || align=right | 3.4 km || 
|-id=030 bgcolor=#d6d6d6
| 119030 ||  || — || February 16, 2001 || Oizumi || T. Kobayashi || — || align=right | 7.9 km || 
|-id=031 bgcolor=#d6d6d6
| 119031 ||  || — || February 17, 2001 || Socorro || LINEAR || — || align=right | 6.0 km || 
|-id=032 bgcolor=#d6d6d6
| 119032 ||  || — || February 19, 2001 || Socorro || LINEAR || EOS || align=right | 3.6 km || 
|-id=033 bgcolor=#d6d6d6
| 119033 ||  || — || March 13, 2001 || Socorro || LINEAR || EUP || align=right | 9.4 km || 
|-id=034 bgcolor=#d6d6d6
| 119034 || 2001 FR || — || March 16, 2001 || Socorro || LINEAR || — || align=right | 7.2 km || 
|-id=035 bgcolor=#d6d6d6
| 119035 ||  || — || March 21, 2001 || Anderson Mesa || LONEOS || — || align=right | 5.8 km || 
|-id=036 bgcolor=#d6d6d6
| 119036 ||  || — || March 18, 2001 || Socorro || LINEAR || — || align=right | 7.7 km || 
|-id=037 bgcolor=#fefefe
| 119037 ||  || — || March 18, 2001 || Socorro || LINEAR || FLO || align=right | 1.3 km || 
|-id=038 bgcolor=#d6d6d6
| 119038 ||  || — || March 21, 2001 || Anderson Mesa || LONEOS || HYG || align=right | 6.5 km || 
|-id=039 bgcolor=#d6d6d6
| 119039 ||  || — || March 16, 2001 || Socorro || LINEAR || Tj (2.93) || align=right | 10 km || 
|-id=040 bgcolor=#d6d6d6
| 119040 ||  || — || March 18, 2001 || Socorro || LINEAR || ALA || align=right | 7.2 km || 
|-id=041 bgcolor=#d6d6d6
| 119041 ||  || — || March 24, 2001 || Kitt Peak || Spacewatch || — || align=right | 6.0 km || 
|-id=042 bgcolor=#fefefe
| 119042 ||  || — || April 17, 2001 || Socorro || LINEAR || — || align=right | 1.4 km || 
|-id=043 bgcolor=#fefefe
| 119043 ||  || — || April 16, 2001 || Socorro || LINEAR || PHO || align=right | 5.4 km || 
|-id=044 bgcolor=#FA8072
| 119044 ||  || — || April 18, 2001 || Kitt Peak || Spacewatch || — || align=right | 1.3 km || 
|-id=045 bgcolor=#fefefe
| 119045 ||  || — || April 21, 2001 || Socorro || LINEAR || PHO || align=right | 1.7 km || 
|-id=046 bgcolor=#fefefe
| 119046 ||  || — || April 18, 2001 || Socorro || LINEAR || FLO || align=right | 1.0 km || 
|-id=047 bgcolor=#FA8072
| 119047 ||  || — || April 18, 2001 || Socorro || LINEAR || — || align=right | 1.5 km || 
|-id=048 bgcolor=#fefefe
| 119048 ||  || — || April 27, 2001 || Socorro || LINEAR || — || align=right | 1.4 km || 
|-id=049 bgcolor=#fefefe
| 119049 ||  || — || April 26, 2001 || Anderson Mesa || LONEOS || — || align=right | 1.2 km || 
|-id=050 bgcolor=#fefefe
| 119050 ||  || — || April 27, 2001 || Kitt Peak || Spacewatch || FLO || align=right | 1.0 km || 
|-id=051 bgcolor=#fefefe
| 119051 ||  || — || May 14, 2001 || Kitt Peak || Spacewatch || — || align=right | 1.3 km || 
|-id=052 bgcolor=#fefefe
| 119052 || 2001 KZ || — || May 17, 2001 || Socorro || LINEAR || — || align=right | 1.4 km || 
|-id=053 bgcolor=#fefefe
| 119053 ||  || — || May 18, 2001 || Socorro || LINEAR || NYS || align=right | 1.3 km || 
|-id=054 bgcolor=#fefefe
| 119054 ||  || — || May 18, 2001 || Socorro || LINEAR || — || align=right | 1.9 km || 
|-id=055 bgcolor=#fefefe
| 119055 ||  || — || May 18, 2001 || Socorro || LINEAR || — || align=right | 1.4 km || 
|-id=056 bgcolor=#FA8072
| 119056 ||  || — || May 18, 2001 || Socorro || LINEAR || — || align=right | 3.0 km || 
|-id=057 bgcolor=#fefefe
| 119057 ||  || — || May 22, 2001 || Socorro || LINEAR || — || align=right | 1.3 km || 
|-id=058 bgcolor=#fefefe
| 119058 ||  || — || May 17, 2001 || Socorro || LINEAR || — || align=right | 1.3 km || 
|-id=059 bgcolor=#fefefe
| 119059 ||  || — || May 17, 2001 || Socorro || LINEAR || — || align=right | 1.6 km || 
|-id=060 bgcolor=#fefefe
| 119060 ||  || — || May 21, 2001 || Socorro || LINEAR || — || align=right | 1.5 km || 
|-id=061 bgcolor=#fefefe
| 119061 ||  || — || May 22, 2001 || Socorro || LINEAR || — || align=right | 1.8 km || 
|-id=062 bgcolor=#fefefe
| 119062 ||  || — || May 22, 2001 || Socorro || LINEAR || — || align=right | 1.6 km || 
|-id=063 bgcolor=#fefefe
| 119063 ||  || — || May 24, 2001 || Socorro || LINEAR || NYS || align=right | 1.5 km || 
|-id=064 bgcolor=#fefefe
| 119064 ||  || — || May 18, 2001 || Anderson Mesa || LONEOS || — || align=right | 1.4 km || 
|-id=065 bgcolor=#fefefe
| 119065 ||  || — || May 24, 2001 || Socorro || LINEAR || — || align=right | 1.1 km || 
|-id=066 bgcolor=#C2E0FF
| 119066 ||  || — || May 23, 2001 || Cerro Tololo || M. W. Buie || res4:7critical || align=right | 193 km || 
|-id=067 bgcolor=#C2E0FF
| 119067 ||  || — || May 23, 2001 || Cerro Tololo || M. W. Buie || cubewano?mooncritical || align=right | 212 km || 
|-id=068 bgcolor=#C2E0FF
| 119068 ||  || — || May 23, 2001 || Cerro Tololo || M. W. Buie || res2:5critical || align=right | 203 km || 
|-id=069 bgcolor=#C2E0FF
| 119069 ||  || — || May 23, 2001 || Cerro Tololo || M. W. Buie || plutinocritical || align=right | 168 km || 
|-id=070 bgcolor=#C2E0FF
| 119070 ||  || — || May 23, 2001 || Cerro Tololo || M. W. Buie || res4:7critical || align=right | 176 km || 
|-id=071 bgcolor=#fefefe
| 119071 ||  || — || June 13, 2001 || Socorro || LINEAR || — || align=right | 2.0 km || 
|-id=072 bgcolor=#fefefe
| 119072 ||  || — || June 13, 2001 || Socorro || LINEAR || — || align=right | 1.8 km || 
|-id=073 bgcolor=#fefefe
| 119073 ||  || — || June 15, 2001 || Socorro || LINEAR || — || align=right | 1.7 km || 
|-id=074 bgcolor=#fefefe
| 119074 ||  || — || June 11, 2001 || Anderson Mesa || LONEOS || — || align=right | 1.2 km || 
|-id=075 bgcolor=#fefefe
| 119075 ||  || — || June 11, 2001 || Kitt Peak || Spacewatch || — || align=right | 1.5 km || 
|-id=076 bgcolor=#fefefe
| 119076 ||  || — || June 15, 2001 || Socorro || LINEAR || — || align=right | 1.5 km || 
|-id=077 bgcolor=#fefefe
| 119077 ||  || — || June 16, 2001 || Palomar || NEAT || — || align=right | 2.1 km || 
|-id=078 bgcolor=#fefefe
| 119078 ||  || — || June 19, 2001 || Palomar || NEAT || — || align=right | 1.8 km || 
|-id=079 bgcolor=#fefefe
| 119079 ||  || — || June 27, 2001 || Palomar || NEAT || — || align=right | 1.3 km || 
|-id=080 bgcolor=#fefefe
| 119080 ||  || — || June 24, 2001 || Socorro || LINEAR || V || align=right | 1.3 km || 
|-id=081 bgcolor=#fefefe
| 119081 ||  || — || July 13, 2001 || Palomar || NEAT || V || align=right | 1.1 km || 
|-id=082 bgcolor=#fefefe
| 119082 ||  || — || July 13, 2001 || Palomar || NEAT || NYS || align=right data-sort-value="0.96" | 960 m || 
|-id=083 bgcolor=#fefefe
| 119083 ||  || — || July 15, 2001 || Ondřejov || L. Kotková || NYS || align=right | 1.1 km || 
|-id=084 bgcolor=#fefefe
| 119084 ||  || — || July 14, 2001 || Palomar || NEAT || — || align=right | 1.5 km || 
|-id=085 bgcolor=#fefefe
| 119085 ||  || — || July 14, 2001 || Palomar || NEAT || V || align=right | 1.3 km || 
|-id=086 bgcolor=#fefefe
| 119086 ||  || — || July 12, 2001 || Haleakala || NEAT || NYS || align=right | 1.2 km || 
|-id=087 bgcolor=#fefefe
| 119087 ||  || — || July 14, 2001 || Palomar || NEAT || — || align=right | 1.9 km || 
|-id=088 bgcolor=#fefefe
| 119088 ||  || — || July 14, 2001 || Palomar || NEAT || V || align=right | 1.2 km || 
|-id=089 bgcolor=#fefefe
| 119089 ||  || — || July 14, 2001 || Palomar || NEAT || — || align=right | 1.6 km || 
|-id=090 bgcolor=#fefefe
| 119090 ||  || — || July 18, 2001 || Palomar || NEAT || — || align=right | 1.3 km || 
|-id=091 bgcolor=#fefefe
| 119091 ||  || — || July 20, 2001 || Anderson Mesa || LONEOS || — || align=right | 2.0 km || 
|-id=092 bgcolor=#fefefe
| 119092 ||  || — || July 19, 2001 || Palomar || NEAT || — || align=right | 1.4 km || 
|-id=093 bgcolor=#fefefe
| 119093 ||  || — || July 17, 2001 || Haleakala || NEAT || V || align=right | 1.2 km || 
|-id=094 bgcolor=#fefefe
| 119094 ||  || — || July 16, 2001 || Anderson Mesa || LONEOS || — || align=right data-sort-value="0.81" | 810 m || 
|-id=095 bgcolor=#fefefe
| 119095 ||  || — || July 17, 2001 || Anderson Mesa || LONEOS || V || align=right | 1.2 km || 
|-id=096 bgcolor=#fefefe
| 119096 ||  || — || July 18, 2001 || Palomar || NEAT || — || align=right | 2.0 km || 
|-id=097 bgcolor=#fefefe
| 119097 ||  || — || July 19, 2001 || Palomar || NEAT || V || align=right | 1.5 km || 
|-id=098 bgcolor=#fefefe
| 119098 ||  || — || July 20, 2001 || Palomar || NEAT || — || align=right | 2.1 km || 
|-id=099 bgcolor=#fefefe
| 119099 ||  || — || July 20, 2001 || Palomar || NEAT || V || align=right | 1.1 km || 
|-id=100 bgcolor=#fefefe
| 119100 ||  || — || July 22, 2001 || Palomar || NEAT || V || align=right | 1.2 km || 
|}

119101–119200 

|-bgcolor=#fefefe
| 119101 ||  || — || July 16, 2001 || Anderson Mesa || LONEOS || — || align=right | 1.8 km || 
|-id=102 bgcolor=#fefefe
| 119102 ||  || — || July 16, 2001 || Haleakala || NEAT || ERI || align=right | 5.6 km || 
|-id=103 bgcolor=#fefefe
| 119103 ||  || — || July 21, 2001 || Palomar || NEAT || FLO || align=right | 1.4 km || 
|-id=104 bgcolor=#fefefe
| 119104 ||  || — || July 21, 2001 || Palomar || NEAT || Vfast? || align=right | 1.2 km || 
|-id=105 bgcolor=#fefefe
| 119105 ||  || — || July 26, 2001 || Palomar || NEAT || V || align=right | 1.4 km || 
|-id=106 bgcolor=#fefefe
| 119106 ||  || — || July 16, 2001 || Anderson Mesa || LONEOS || — || align=right | 1.6 km || 
|-id=107 bgcolor=#fefefe
| 119107 ||  || — || July 16, 2001 || Anderson Mesa || LONEOS || NYS || align=right | 1.3 km || 
|-id=108 bgcolor=#fefefe
| 119108 ||  || — || July 23, 2001 || Haleakala || NEAT || — || align=right | 1.8 km || 
|-id=109 bgcolor=#E9E9E9
| 119109 ||  || — || July 19, 2001 || Haleakala || NEAT || — || align=right | 2.8 km || 
|-id=110 bgcolor=#fefefe
| 119110 ||  || — || July 19, 2001 || Palomar || NEAT || MAS || align=right | 1.7 km || 
|-id=111 bgcolor=#fefefe
| 119111 ||  || — || July 20, 2001 || Palomar || NEAT || NYS || align=right | 1.6 km || 
|-id=112 bgcolor=#fefefe
| 119112 ||  || — || July 25, 2001 || Palomar || NEAT || FLO || align=right | 2.2 km || 
|-id=113 bgcolor=#fefefe
| 119113 ||  || — || July 28, 2001 || Ondřejov || Ondřejov Obs. || V || align=right | 1.2 km || 
|-id=114 bgcolor=#fefefe
| 119114 ||  || — || July 26, 2001 || Palomar || NEAT || ERI || align=right | 3.5 km || 
|-id=115 bgcolor=#fefefe
| 119115 ||  || — || July 29, 2001 || Palomar || NEAT || — || align=right | 1.2 km || 
|-id=116 bgcolor=#fefefe
| 119116 ||  || — || July 29, 2001 || Socorro || LINEAR || — || align=right | 3.9 km || 
|-id=117 bgcolor=#fefefe
| 119117 ||  || — || July 26, 2001 || Haleakala || NEAT || MAS || align=right | 1.6 km || 
|-id=118 bgcolor=#fefefe
| 119118 ||  || — || July 20, 2001 || Anderson Mesa || LONEOS || — || align=right data-sort-value="0.91" | 910 m || 
|-id=119 bgcolor=#fefefe
| 119119 ||  || — || July 28, 2001 || Haleakala || NEAT || NYS || align=right | 1.5 km || 
|-id=120 bgcolor=#E9E9E9
| 119120 ||  || — || July 29, 2001 || Palomar || NEAT || — || align=right | 2.7 km || 
|-id=121 bgcolor=#fefefe
| 119121 ||  || — || July 20, 2001 || Haleakala || NEAT || ERI || align=right | 3.7 km || 
|-id=122 bgcolor=#fefefe
| 119122 ||  || — || July 23, 2001 || Haleakala || NEAT || FLO || align=right data-sort-value="0.95" | 950 m || 
|-id=123 bgcolor=#fefefe
| 119123 ||  || — || July 25, 2001 || Haleakala || NEAT || — || align=right | 1.5 km || 
|-id=124 bgcolor=#fefefe
| 119124 ||  || — || July 27, 2001 || Anderson Mesa || LONEOS || — || align=right | 1.9 km || 
|-id=125 bgcolor=#fefefe
| 119125 ||  || — || July 27, 2001 || Anderson Mesa || LONEOS || NYS || align=right | 1.0 km || 
|-id=126 bgcolor=#fefefe
| 119126 ||  || — || July 28, 2001 || Anderson Mesa || LONEOS || V || align=right | 1.4 km || 
|-id=127 bgcolor=#fefefe
| 119127 ||  || — || July 28, 2001 || Anderson Mesa || LONEOS || — || align=right | 1.4 km || 
|-id=128 bgcolor=#fefefe
| 119128 ||  || — || July 28, 2001 || Haleakala || NEAT || — || align=right | 1.4 km || 
|-id=129 bgcolor=#fefefe
| 119129 ||  || — || July 16, 2001 || Anderson Mesa || LONEOS || MAS || align=right | 1.1 km || 
|-id=130 bgcolor=#fefefe
| 119130 ||  || — || July 27, 2001 || Anderson Mesa || LONEOS || NYS || align=right | 1.3 km || 
|-id=131 bgcolor=#fefefe
| 119131 || 2001 PN || — || August 1, 2001 || Palomar || NEAT || FLO || align=right | 1.2 km || 
|-id=132 bgcolor=#fefefe
| 119132 ||  || — || August 8, 2001 || Palomar || NEAT || MAS || align=right | 1.5 km || 
|-id=133 bgcolor=#fefefe
| 119133 ||  || — || August 8, 2001 || Haleakala || NEAT || — || align=right | 1.3 km || 
|-id=134 bgcolor=#fefefe
| 119134 ||  || — || August 8, 2001 || Haleakala || NEAT || V || align=right | 1.0 km || 
|-id=135 bgcolor=#fefefe
| 119135 ||  || — || August 8, 2001 || Haleakala || NEAT || V || align=right | 1.1 km || 
|-id=136 bgcolor=#fefefe
| 119136 ||  || — || August 11, 2001 || Haleakala || NEAT || V || align=right | 1.6 km || 
|-id=137 bgcolor=#fefefe
| 119137 ||  || — || August 11, 2001 || Haleakala || NEAT || — || align=right | 2.0 km || 
|-id=138 bgcolor=#fefefe
| 119138 ||  || — || August 9, 2001 || Palomar || NEAT || — || align=right | 1.6 km || 
|-id=139 bgcolor=#fefefe
| 119139 ||  || — || August 9, 2001 || Palomar || NEAT || — || align=right | 1.5 km || 
|-id=140 bgcolor=#E9E9E9
| 119140 ||  || — || August 11, 2001 || Haleakala || NEAT || — || align=right | 3.8 km || 
|-id=141 bgcolor=#fefefe
| 119141 ||  || — || August 11, 2001 || Haleakala || NEAT || — || align=right | 1.6 km || 
|-id=142 bgcolor=#fefefe
| 119142 ||  || — || August 11, 2001 || Haleakala || NEAT || — || align=right | 1.4 km || 
|-id=143 bgcolor=#fefefe
| 119143 ||  || — || August 13, 2001 || Haleakala || NEAT || NYS || align=right | 1.2 km || 
|-id=144 bgcolor=#fefefe
| 119144 ||  || — || August 10, 2001 || Palomar || NEAT || — || align=right | 1.8 km || 
|-id=145 bgcolor=#fefefe
| 119145 ||  || — || August 11, 2001 || Palomar || NEAT || — || align=right | 2.1 km || 
|-id=146 bgcolor=#fefefe
| 119146 ||  || — || August 12, 2001 || Palomar || NEAT || — || align=right | 1.3 km || 
|-id=147 bgcolor=#FA8072
| 119147 ||  || — || August 14, 2001 || Bergisch Gladbach || W. Bickel || PHO || align=right | 2.3 km || 
|-id=148 bgcolor=#E9E9E9
| 119148 ||  || — || August 14, 2001 || Palomar || NEAT || — || align=right | 2.6 km || 
|-id=149 bgcolor=#fefefe
| 119149 ||  || — || August 14, 2001 || Haleakala || NEAT || NYS || align=right | 1.2 km || 
|-id=150 bgcolor=#fefefe
| 119150 ||  || — || August 13, 2001 || Haleakala || NEAT || NYS || align=right | 1.4 km || 
|-id=151 bgcolor=#fefefe
| 119151 ||  || — || August 13, 2001 || Haleakala || NEAT || — || align=right | 4.2 km || 
|-id=152 bgcolor=#fefefe
| 119152 ||  || — || August 13, 2001 || Haleakala || NEAT || NYS || align=right | 1.8 km || 
|-id=153 bgcolor=#fefefe
| 119153 ||  || — || August 16, 2001 || Socorro || LINEAR || NYS || align=right | 2.8 km || 
|-id=154 bgcolor=#fefefe
| 119154 ||  || — || August 16, 2001 || Socorro || LINEAR || NYS || align=right | 1.0 km || 
|-id=155 bgcolor=#fefefe
| 119155 ||  || — || August 16, 2001 || Socorro || LINEAR || — || align=right | 1.5 km || 
|-id=156 bgcolor=#E9E9E9
| 119156 ||  || — || August 16, 2001 || Socorro || LINEAR || — || align=right | 1.5 km || 
|-id=157 bgcolor=#fefefe
| 119157 ||  || — || August 16, 2001 || Socorro || LINEAR || MAS || align=right | 1.6 km || 
|-id=158 bgcolor=#E9E9E9
| 119158 ||  || — || August 16, 2001 || Socorro || LINEAR || — || align=right | 1.8 km || 
|-id=159 bgcolor=#fefefe
| 119159 ||  || — || August 16, 2001 || Socorro || LINEAR || FLO || align=right | 1.7 km || 
|-id=160 bgcolor=#fefefe
| 119160 ||  || — || August 16, 2001 || Socorro || LINEAR || NYS || align=right | 1.3 km || 
|-id=161 bgcolor=#E9E9E9
| 119161 ||  || — || August 16, 2001 || Socorro || LINEAR || — || align=right | 2.2 km || 
|-id=162 bgcolor=#fefefe
| 119162 ||  || — || August 16, 2001 || Socorro || LINEAR || NYS || align=right | 1.1 km || 
|-id=163 bgcolor=#fefefe
| 119163 ||  || — || August 16, 2001 || Socorro || LINEAR || — || align=right | 4.7 km || 
|-id=164 bgcolor=#fefefe
| 119164 ||  || — || August 16, 2001 || Socorro || LINEAR || NYS || align=right | 1.3 km || 
|-id=165 bgcolor=#fefefe
| 119165 ||  || — || August 16, 2001 || Socorro || LINEAR || — || align=right | 1.9 km || 
|-id=166 bgcolor=#fefefe
| 119166 ||  || — || August 16, 2001 || Socorro || LINEAR || — || align=right | 2.5 km || 
|-id=167 bgcolor=#fefefe
| 119167 ||  || — || August 16, 2001 || Socorro || LINEAR || NYS || align=right | 1.0 km || 
|-id=168 bgcolor=#fefefe
| 119168 ||  || — || August 16, 2001 || Socorro || LINEAR || — || align=right | 1.4 km || 
|-id=169 bgcolor=#fefefe
| 119169 ||  || — || August 16, 2001 || Socorro || LINEAR || — || align=right | 1.7 km || 
|-id=170 bgcolor=#fefefe
| 119170 ||  || — || August 16, 2001 || Socorro || LINEAR || MAS || align=right | 1.2 km || 
|-id=171 bgcolor=#fefefe
| 119171 ||  || — || August 16, 2001 || Socorro || LINEAR || V || align=right | 1.4 km || 
|-id=172 bgcolor=#fefefe
| 119172 ||  || — || August 16, 2001 || Socorro || LINEAR || MAS || align=right | 1.2 km || 
|-id=173 bgcolor=#fefefe
| 119173 ||  || — || August 16, 2001 || Socorro || LINEAR || NYS || align=right | 1.4 km || 
|-id=174 bgcolor=#fefefe
| 119174 ||  || — || August 16, 2001 || Socorro || LINEAR || — || align=right | 1.6 km || 
|-id=175 bgcolor=#fefefe
| 119175 ||  || — || August 16, 2001 || Socorro || LINEAR || NYSslow || align=right | 1.2 km || 
|-id=176 bgcolor=#fefefe
| 119176 ||  || — || August 16, 2001 || Socorro || LINEAR || MAS || align=right | 1.6 km || 
|-id=177 bgcolor=#fefefe
| 119177 ||  || — || August 16, 2001 || Socorro || LINEAR || NYS || align=right data-sort-value="0.98" | 980 m || 
|-id=178 bgcolor=#fefefe
| 119178 ||  || — || August 17, 2001 || Socorro || LINEAR || — || align=right | 1.6 km || 
|-id=179 bgcolor=#fefefe
| 119179 ||  || — || August 19, 2001 || Socorro || LINEAR || NYS || align=right | 1.0 km || 
|-id=180 bgcolor=#fefefe
| 119180 ||  || — || August 20, 2001 || Oakley || C. Wolfe || — || align=right | 3.5 km || 
|-id=181 bgcolor=#fefefe
| 119181 ||  || — || August 17, 2001 || Socorro || LINEAR || — || align=right | 1.7 km || 
|-id=182 bgcolor=#fefefe
| 119182 ||  || — || August 17, 2001 || Socorro || LINEAR || — || align=right | 2.5 km || 
|-id=183 bgcolor=#E9E9E9
| 119183 ||  || — || August 17, 2001 || Socorro || LINEAR || — || align=right | 1.8 km || 
|-id=184 bgcolor=#fefefe
| 119184 ||  || — || August 17, 2001 || Palomar || NEAT || — || align=right | 3.8 km || 
|-id=185 bgcolor=#fefefe
| 119185 ||  || — || August 21, 2001 || Kitt Peak || Spacewatch || NYS || align=right data-sort-value="0.99" | 990 m || 
|-id=186 bgcolor=#E9E9E9
| 119186 ||  || — || August 22, 2001 || Socorro || LINEAR || — || align=right | 2.3 km || 
|-id=187 bgcolor=#E9E9E9
| 119187 ||  || — || August 22, 2001 || Socorro || LINEAR || — || align=right | 2.5 km || 
|-id=188 bgcolor=#fefefe
| 119188 ||  || — || August 17, 2001 || Socorro || LINEAR || — || align=right | 1.9 km || 
|-id=189 bgcolor=#fefefe
| 119189 ||  || — || August 19, 2001 || Socorro || LINEAR || NYS || align=right | 1.4 km || 
|-id=190 bgcolor=#fefefe
| 119190 ||  || — || August 20, 2001 || Socorro || LINEAR || — || align=right | 1.7 km || 
|-id=191 bgcolor=#fefefe
| 119191 ||  || — || August 22, 2001 || Socorro || LINEAR || V || align=right | 1.4 km || 
|-id=192 bgcolor=#fefefe
| 119192 ||  || — || August 23, 2001 || Anderson Mesa || LONEOS || — || align=right | 1.4 km || 
|-id=193 bgcolor=#fefefe
| 119193 ||  || — || August 23, 2001 || Desert Eagle || W. K. Y. Yeung || — || align=right | 2.2 km || 
|-id=194 bgcolor=#fefefe
| 119194 ||  || — || August 20, 2001 || Palomar || NEAT || — || align=right | 2.2 km || 
|-id=195 bgcolor=#fefefe
| 119195 Margaretgreer ||  ||  || August 25, 2001 || Emerald Lane || L. Ball || — || align=right | 1.6 km || 
|-id=196 bgcolor=#fefefe
| 119196 ||  || — || August 25, 2001 || Socorro || LINEAR || KLI || align=right | 4.9 km || 
|-id=197 bgcolor=#fefefe
| 119197 ||  || — || August 17, 2001 || Socorro || LINEAR || — || align=right | 2.0 km || 
|-id=198 bgcolor=#fefefe
| 119198 ||  || — || August 19, 2001 || Socorro || LINEAR || V || align=right | 1.2 km || 
|-id=199 bgcolor=#fefefe
| 119199 ||  || — || August 19, 2001 || Socorro || LINEAR || — || align=right | 1.5 km || 
|-id=200 bgcolor=#fefefe
| 119200 ||  || — || August 19, 2001 || Socorro || LINEAR || — || align=right | 1.2 km || 
|}

119201–119300 

|-bgcolor=#fefefe
| 119201 ||  || — || August 20, 2001 || Socorro || LINEAR || V || align=right | 1.4 km || 
|-id=202 bgcolor=#fefefe
| 119202 ||  || — || August 20, 2001 || Socorro || LINEAR || — || align=right | 1.7 km || 
|-id=203 bgcolor=#fefefe
| 119203 ||  || — || August 20, 2001 || Socorro || LINEAR || V || align=right | 1.4 km || 
|-id=204 bgcolor=#fefefe
| 119204 ||  || — || August 20, 2001 || Socorro || LINEAR || FLO || align=right | 1.3 km || 
|-id=205 bgcolor=#fefefe
| 119205 ||  || — || August 24, 2001 || Socorro || LINEAR || MAS || align=right | 1.4 km || 
|-id=206 bgcolor=#fefefe
| 119206 ||  || — || August 25, 2001 || Kitt Peak || Spacewatch || NYS || align=right | 1.2 km || 
|-id=207 bgcolor=#fefefe
| 119207 ||  || — || August 21, 2001 || Haleakala || NEAT || NYS || align=right | 1.2 km || 
|-id=208 bgcolor=#E9E9E9
| 119208 ||  || — || August 23, 2001 || Anderson Mesa || LONEOS || — || align=right | 1.4 km || 
|-id=209 bgcolor=#fefefe
| 119209 ||  || — || August 23, 2001 || Anderson Mesa || LONEOS || V || align=right | 1.2 km || 
|-id=210 bgcolor=#fefefe
| 119210 ||  || — || August 23, 2001 || Anderson Mesa || LONEOS || MAS || align=right | 1.3 km || 
|-id=211 bgcolor=#fefefe
| 119211 ||  || — || August 23, 2001 || Anderson Mesa || LONEOS || — || align=right | 1.5 km || 
|-id=212 bgcolor=#fefefe
| 119212 ||  || — || August 24, 2001 || Haleakala || NEAT || — || align=right | 1.8 km || 
|-id=213 bgcolor=#fefefe
| 119213 ||  || — || August 25, 2001 || Haleakala || NEAT || — || align=right | 1.1 km || 
|-id=214 bgcolor=#fefefe
| 119214 ||  || — || August 25, 2001 || Socorro || LINEAR || V || align=right | 1.1 km || 
|-id=215 bgcolor=#fefefe
| 119215 ||  || — || August 22, 2001 || Kitt Peak || Spacewatch || — || align=right | 1.9 km || 
|-id=216 bgcolor=#fefefe
| 119216 ||  || — || August 22, 2001 || Haleakala || NEAT || V || align=right | 1.1 km || 
|-id=217 bgcolor=#fefefe
| 119217 ||  || — || August 22, 2001 || Socorro || LINEAR || FLO || align=right | 2.8 km || 
|-id=218 bgcolor=#fefefe
| 119218 ||  || — || August 23, 2001 || Anderson Mesa || LONEOS || V || align=right | 1.3 km || 
|-id=219 bgcolor=#fefefe
| 119219 ||  || — || August 23, 2001 || Anderson Mesa || LONEOS || NYS || align=right | 1.1 km || 
|-id=220 bgcolor=#E9E9E9
| 119220 ||  || — || August 23, 2001 || Anderson Mesa || LONEOS || — || align=right | 2.2 km || 
|-id=221 bgcolor=#fefefe
| 119221 ||  || — || August 23, 2001 || Anderson Mesa || LONEOS || MAS || align=right | 1.4 km || 
|-id=222 bgcolor=#fefefe
| 119222 ||  || — || August 23, 2001 || Anderson Mesa || LONEOS || — || align=right | 1.3 km || 
|-id=223 bgcolor=#E9E9E9
| 119223 ||  || — || August 23, 2001 || Socorro || LINEAR || EUN || align=right | 2.4 km || 
|-id=224 bgcolor=#fefefe
| 119224 ||  || — || August 24, 2001 || Anderson Mesa || LONEOS || — || align=right | 1.5 km || 
|-id=225 bgcolor=#fefefe
| 119225 ||  || — || August 24, 2001 || Anderson Mesa || LONEOS || — || align=right | 3.2 km || 
|-id=226 bgcolor=#fefefe
| 119226 ||  || — || August 24, 2001 || Anderson Mesa || LONEOS || — || align=right | 1.6 km || 
|-id=227 bgcolor=#fefefe
| 119227 ||  || — || August 24, 2001 || Anderson Mesa || LONEOS || V || align=right | 1.9 km || 
|-id=228 bgcolor=#fefefe
| 119228 ||  || — || August 24, 2001 || Anderson Mesa || LONEOS || — || align=right | 2.5 km || 
|-id=229 bgcolor=#fefefe
| 119229 ||  || — || August 24, 2001 || Socorro || LINEAR || — || align=right | 1.6 km || 
|-id=230 bgcolor=#fefefe
| 119230 ||  || — || August 24, 2001 || Socorro || LINEAR || NYS || align=right | 1.2 km || 
|-id=231 bgcolor=#E9E9E9
| 119231 ||  || — || August 24, 2001 || Socorro || LINEAR || MAR || align=right | 1.8 km || 
|-id=232 bgcolor=#fefefe
| 119232 ||  || — || August 24, 2001 || Socorro || LINEAR || V || align=right | 1.4 km || 
|-id=233 bgcolor=#E9E9E9
| 119233 ||  || — || August 24, 2001 || Socorro || LINEAR || — || align=right | 4.3 km || 
|-id=234 bgcolor=#fefefe
| 119234 ||  || — || August 25, 2001 || Socorro || LINEAR || V || align=right | 1.4 km || 
|-id=235 bgcolor=#fefefe
| 119235 ||  || — || August 25, 2001 || Socorro || LINEAR || — || align=right | 2.0 km || 
|-id=236 bgcolor=#fefefe
| 119236 ||  || — || August 19, 2001 || Socorro || LINEAR || FLO || align=right | 1.2 km || 
|-id=237 bgcolor=#E9E9E9
| 119237 ||  || — || August 19, 2001 || Socorro || LINEAR || — || align=right | 2.5 km || 
|-id=238 bgcolor=#fefefe
| 119238 ||  || — || August 19, 2001 || Socorro || LINEAR || PHO || align=right | 2.3 km || 
|-id=239 bgcolor=#fefefe
| 119239 ||  || — || August 19, 2001 || Socorro || LINEAR || — || align=right | 5.1 km || 
|-id=240 bgcolor=#fefefe
| 119240 ||  || — || August 19, 2001 || Socorro || LINEAR || — || align=right | 2.1 km || 
|-id=241 bgcolor=#fefefe
| 119241 ||  || — || August 19, 2001 || Anderson Mesa || LONEOS || — || align=right | 1.8 km || 
|-id=242 bgcolor=#fefefe
| 119242 ||  || — || August 17, 2001 || Palomar || NEAT || — || align=right | 1.7 km || 
|-id=243 bgcolor=#fefefe
| 119243 ||  || — || August 16, 2001 || Palomar || NEAT || NYS || align=right | 3.3 km || 
|-id=244 bgcolor=#fefefe
| 119244 ||  || — || August 16, 2001 || Socorro || LINEAR || MAS || align=right | 1.0 km || 
|-id=245 bgcolor=#fefefe
| 119245 ||  || — || August 26, 2001 || Socorro || LINEAR || PHO || align=right | 3.8 km || 
|-id=246 bgcolor=#fefefe
| 119246 ||  || — || August 24, 2001 || Socorro || LINEAR || MAS || align=right | 1.4 km || 
|-id=247 bgcolor=#fefefe
| 119247 ||  || — || August 24, 2001 || Socorro || LINEAR || — || align=right | 2.5 km || 
|-id=248 bgcolor=#fefefe
| 119248 Corbally ||  ||  || September 10, 2001 || Goodricke-Pigott || R. A. Tucker || — || align=right | 1.5 km || 
|-id=249 bgcolor=#fefefe
| 119249 ||  || — || September 10, 2001 || Socorro || LINEAR || MAS || align=right | 1.6 km || 
|-id=250 bgcolor=#E9E9E9
| 119250 ||  || — || September 7, 2001 || Socorro || LINEAR || — || align=right | 3.3 km || 
|-id=251 bgcolor=#fefefe
| 119251 ||  || — || September 7, 2001 || Socorro || LINEAR || — || align=right | 1.6 km || 
|-id=252 bgcolor=#fefefe
| 119252 ||  || — || September 7, 2001 || Socorro || LINEAR || — || align=right | 1.6 km || 
|-id=253 bgcolor=#fefefe
| 119253 ||  || — || September 7, 2001 || Socorro || LINEAR || MAS || align=right | 1.1 km || 
|-id=254 bgcolor=#fefefe
| 119254 ||  || — || September 7, 2001 || Socorro || LINEAR || — || align=right | 1.6 km || 
|-id=255 bgcolor=#fefefe
| 119255 ||  || — || September 7, 2001 || Socorro || LINEAR || NYS || align=right | 1.0 km || 
|-id=256 bgcolor=#E9E9E9
| 119256 ||  || — || September 7, 2001 || Socorro || LINEAR || — || align=right | 3.9 km || 
|-id=257 bgcolor=#E9E9E9
| 119257 ||  || — || September 8, 2001 || Socorro || LINEAR || — || align=right | 2.3 km || 
|-id=258 bgcolor=#fefefe
| 119258 ||  || — || September 10, 2001 || Socorro || LINEAR || — || align=right | 1.7 km || 
|-id=259 bgcolor=#fefefe
| 119259 ||  || — || September 9, 2001 || Palomar || NEAT || V || align=right | 1.3 km || 
|-id=260 bgcolor=#fefefe
| 119260 ||  || — || September 9, 2001 || Palomar || NEAT || V || align=right | 1.5 km || 
|-id=261 bgcolor=#fefefe
| 119261 ||  || — || September 11, 2001 || Desert Eagle || W. K. Y. Yeung || — || align=right | 5.0 km || 
|-id=262 bgcolor=#fefefe
| 119262 ||  || — || September 10, 2001 || Socorro || LINEAR || — || align=right | 1.5 km || 
|-id=263 bgcolor=#fefefe
| 119263 ||  || — || September 11, 2001 || Socorro || LINEAR || — || align=right | 1.7 km || 
|-id=264 bgcolor=#fefefe
| 119264 ||  || — || September 12, 2001 || Socorro || LINEAR || NYS || align=right | 1.6 km || 
|-id=265 bgcolor=#fefefe
| 119265 ||  || — || September 12, 2001 || Socorro || LINEAR || — || align=right | 1.9 km || 
|-id=266 bgcolor=#fefefe
| 119266 ||  || — || September 12, 2001 || Socorro || LINEAR || — || align=right | 1.8 km || 
|-id=267 bgcolor=#fefefe
| 119267 ||  || — || September 10, 2001 || Socorro || LINEAR || V || align=right | 1.5 km || 
|-id=268 bgcolor=#fefefe
| 119268 ||  || — || September 10, 2001 || Socorro || LINEAR || — || align=right | 1.8 km || 
|-id=269 bgcolor=#fefefe
| 119269 ||  || — || September 10, 2001 || Socorro || LINEAR || V || align=right | 1.4 km || 
|-id=270 bgcolor=#fefefe
| 119270 ||  || — || September 10, 2001 || Socorro || LINEAR || — || align=right | 2.0 km || 
|-id=271 bgcolor=#E9E9E9
| 119271 ||  || — || September 10, 2001 || Socorro || LINEAR || — || align=right | 1.9 km || 
|-id=272 bgcolor=#E9E9E9
| 119272 ||  || — || September 10, 2001 || Socorro || LINEAR || — || align=right | 2.8 km || 
|-id=273 bgcolor=#E9E9E9
| 119273 ||  || — || September 10, 2001 || Socorro || LINEAR || — || align=right | 4.7 km || 
|-id=274 bgcolor=#fefefe
| 119274 ||  || — || September 12, 2001 || Socorro || LINEAR || — || align=right | 2.4 km || 
|-id=275 bgcolor=#fefefe
| 119275 ||  || — || September 14, 2001 || Palomar || NEAT || — || align=right | 1.4 km || 
|-id=276 bgcolor=#fefefe
| 119276 ||  || — || September 11, 2001 || Anderson Mesa || LONEOS || — || align=right | 3.2 km || 
|-id=277 bgcolor=#fefefe
| 119277 ||  || — || September 11, 2001 || Anderson Mesa || LONEOS || NYS || align=right | 1.4 km || 
|-id=278 bgcolor=#fefefe
| 119278 ||  || — || September 11, 2001 || Anderson Mesa || LONEOS || NYS || align=right | 1.2 km || 
|-id=279 bgcolor=#E9E9E9
| 119279 ||  || — || September 11, 2001 || Anderson Mesa || LONEOS || — || align=right | 1.5 km || 
|-id=280 bgcolor=#E9E9E9
| 119280 ||  || — || September 11, 2001 || Anderson Mesa || LONEOS || — || align=right | 1.7 km || 
|-id=281 bgcolor=#fefefe
| 119281 ||  || — || September 9, 2001 || Palomar || NEAT || — || align=right | 1.9 km || 
|-id=282 bgcolor=#fefefe
| 119282 ||  || — || September 12, 2001 || Socorro || LINEAR || — || align=right | 1.3 km || 
|-id=283 bgcolor=#fefefe
| 119283 ||  || — || September 12, 2001 || Socorro || LINEAR || ERI || align=right | 2.7 km || 
|-id=284 bgcolor=#fefefe
| 119284 ||  || — || September 12, 2001 || Socorro || LINEAR || — || align=right | 1.1 km || 
|-id=285 bgcolor=#fefefe
| 119285 ||  || — || September 12, 2001 || Socorro || LINEAR || — || align=right | 1.5 km || 
|-id=286 bgcolor=#fefefe
| 119286 ||  || — || September 12, 2001 || Socorro || LINEAR || NYS || align=right | 1.2 km || 
|-id=287 bgcolor=#fefefe
| 119287 ||  || — || September 12, 2001 || Socorro || LINEAR || — || align=right | 1.7 km || 
|-id=288 bgcolor=#fefefe
| 119288 ||  || — || September 12, 2001 || Socorro || LINEAR || MAS || align=right | 1.7 km || 
|-id=289 bgcolor=#fefefe
| 119289 ||  || — || September 12, 2001 || Socorro || LINEAR || — || align=right | 1.4 km || 
|-id=290 bgcolor=#fefefe
| 119290 ||  || — || September 12, 2001 || Socorro || LINEAR || NYS || align=right | 1.1 km || 
|-id=291 bgcolor=#fefefe
| 119291 ||  || — || September 12, 2001 || Socorro || LINEAR || MAS || align=right | 1.3 km || 
|-id=292 bgcolor=#fefefe
| 119292 ||  || — || September 17, 2001 || Desert Eagle || W. K. Y. Yeung || — || align=right | 1.5 km || 
|-id=293 bgcolor=#fefefe
| 119293 ||  || — || September 17, 2001 || Desert Eagle || W. K. Y. Yeung || V || align=right | 1.4 km || 
|-id=294 bgcolor=#fefefe
| 119294 ||  || — || September 18, 2001 || Kitt Peak || Spacewatch || — || align=right | 1.4 km || 
|-id=295 bgcolor=#E9E9E9
| 119295 ||  || — || September 18, 2001 || Desert Eagle || W. K. Y. Yeung || — || align=right | 2.1 km || 
|-id=296 bgcolor=#E9E9E9
| 119296 ||  || — || September 20, 2001 || Desert Eagle || W. K. Y. Yeung || — || align=right | 3.4 km || 
|-id=297 bgcolor=#fefefe
| 119297 ||  || — || September 16, 2001 || Socorro || LINEAR || NYS || align=right | 1.1 km || 
|-id=298 bgcolor=#E9E9E9
| 119298 ||  || — || September 16, 2001 || Socorro || LINEAR || — || align=right | 1.5 km || 
|-id=299 bgcolor=#fefefe
| 119299 ||  || — || September 16, 2001 || Socorro || LINEAR || — || align=right | 1.9 km || 
|-id=300 bgcolor=#fefefe
| 119300 ||  || — || September 16, 2001 || Socorro || LINEAR || NYS || align=right | 1.2 km || 
|}

119301–119400 

|-bgcolor=#E9E9E9
| 119301 ||  || — || September 16, 2001 || Socorro || LINEAR || — || align=right | 3.8 km || 
|-id=302 bgcolor=#fefefe
| 119302 ||  || — || September 16, 2001 || Socorro || LINEAR || NYS || align=right | 3.8 km || 
|-id=303 bgcolor=#fefefe
| 119303 ||  || — || September 16, 2001 || Socorro || LINEAR || — || align=right | 1.4 km || 
|-id=304 bgcolor=#E9E9E9
| 119304 ||  || — || September 16, 2001 || Socorro || LINEAR || — || align=right | 2.4 km || 
|-id=305 bgcolor=#fefefe
| 119305 ||  || — || September 16, 2001 || Socorro || LINEAR || MAS || align=right | 1.3 km || 
|-id=306 bgcolor=#fefefe
| 119306 ||  || — || September 16, 2001 || Socorro || LINEAR || — || align=right | 1.9 km || 
|-id=307 bgcolor=#fefefe
| 119307 ||  || — || September 16, 2001 || Socorro || LINEAR || NYS || align=right | 3.3 km || 
|-id=308 bgcolor=#fefefe
| 119308 ||  || — || September 16, 2001 || Socorro || LINEAR || V || align=right | 1.2 km || 
|-id=309 bgcolor=#fefefe
| 119309 ||  || — || September 16, 2001 || Socorro || LINEAR || — || align=right | 2.7 km || 
|-id=310 bgcolor=#E9E9E9
| 119310 ||  || — || September 17, 2001 || Socorro || LINEAR || — || align=right | 2.5 km || 
|-id=311 bgcolor=#E9E9E9
| 119311 ||  || — || September 17, 2001 || Socorro || LINEAR || — || align=right | 1.4 km || 
|-id=312 bgcolor=#E9E9E9
| 119312 ||  || — || September 17, 2001 || Socorro || LINEAR || — || align=right | 3.0 km || 
|-id=313 bgcolor=#E9E9E9
| 119313 ||  || — || September 17, 2001 || Socorro || LINEAR || — || align=right | 1.8 km || 
|-id=314 bgcolor=#E9E9E9
| 119314 ||  || — || September 17, 2001 || Socorro || LINEAR || — || align=right | 2.2 km || 
|-id=315 bgcolor=#C7FF8F
| 119315 ||  || — || September 19, 2001 || Kitt Peak || Spacewatch || centaurcritical || align=right | 53 km || 
|-id=316 bgcolor=#fefefe
| 119316 ||  || — || September 20, 2001 || Socorro || LINEAR || — || align=right | 1.7 km || 
|-id=317 bgcolor=#fefefe
| 119317 ||  || — || September 20, 2001 || Socorro || LINEAR || — || align=right | 2.8 km || 
|-id=318 bgcolor=#fefefe
| 119318 ||  || — || September 20, 2001 || Socorro || LINEAR || MAS || align=right | 1.2 km || 
|-id=319 bgcolor=#E9E9E9
| 119319 ||  || — || September 20, 2001 || Socorro || LINEAR || — || align=right | 1.5 km || 
|-id=320 bgcolor=#E9E9E9
| 119320 ||  || — || September 20, 2001 || Socorro || LINEAR || — || align=right | 3.4 km || 
|-id=321 bgcolor=#fefefe
| 119321 ||  || — || September 20, 2001 || Desert Eagle || W. K. Y. Yeung || — || align=right | 1.8 km || 
|-id=322 bgcolor=#fefefe
| 119322 ||  || — || September 16, 2001 || Socorro || LINEAR || — || align=right | 1.8 km || 
|-id=323 bgcolor=#E9E9E9
| 119323 ||  || — || September 16, 2001 || Socorro || LINEAR || — || align=right | 3.1 km || 
|-id=324 bgcolor=#fefefe
| 119324 ||  || — || September 16, 2001 || Socorro || LINEAR || — || align=right | 1.7 km || 
|-id=325 bgcolor=#fefefe
| 119325 ||  || — || September 16, 2001 || Socorro || LINEAR || FLO || align=right | 1.1 km || 
|-id=326 bgcolor=#fefefe
| 119326 ||  || — || September 16, 2001 || Socorro || LINEAR || V || align=right | 1.2 km || 
|-id=327 bgcolor=#fefefe
| 119327 ||  || — || September 16, 2001 || Socorro || LINEAR || NYS || align=right data-sort-value="0.98" | 980 m || 
|-id=328 bgcolor=#fefefe
| 119328 ||  || — || September 16, 2001 || Socorro || LINEAR || NYS || align=right | 1.5 km || 
|-id=329 bgcolor=#fefefe
| 119329 ||  || — || September 16, 2001 || Socorro || LINEAR || MAS || align=right | 1.4 km || 
|-id=330 bgcolor=#fefefe
| 119330 ||  || — || September 16, 2001 || Socorro || LINEAR || — || align=right | 1.7 km || 
|-id=331 bgcolor=#fefefe
| 119331 ||  || — || September 16, 2001 || Socorro || LINEAR || — || align=right | 1.6 km || 
|-id=332 bgcolor=#E9E9E9
| 119332 ||  || — || September 16, 2001 || Socorro || LINEAR || — || align=right | 1.7 km || 
|-id=333 bgcolor=#E9E9E9
| 119333 ||  || — || September 16, 2001 || Socorro || LINEAR || — || align=right | 1.4 km || 
|-id=334 bgcolor=#fefefe
| 119334 ||  || — || September 16, 2001 || Socorro || LINEAR || — || align=right | 2.0 km || 
|-id=335 bgcolor=#fefefe
| 119335 ||  || — || September 16, 2001 || Socorro || LINEAR || — || align=right | 2.8 km || 
|-id=336 bgcolor=#fefefe
| 119336 ||  || — || September 16, 2001 || Socorro || LINEAR || V || align=right | 1.2 km || 
|-id=337 bgcolor=#fefefe
| 119337 ||  || — || September 16, 2001 || Socorro || LINEAR || NYS || align=right | 1.4 km || 
|-id=338 bgcolor=#E9E9E9
| 119338 ||  || — || September 17, 2001 || Socorro || LINEAR || PAD || align=right | 3.1 km || 
|-id=339 bgcolor=#fefefe
| 119339 ||  || — || September 17, 2001 || Socorro || LINEAR || — || align=right | 2.4 km || 
|-id=340 bgcolor=#fefefe
| 119340 ||  || — || September 17, 2001 || Socorro || LINEAR || NYS || align=right | 1.3 km || 
|-id=341 bgcolor=#fefefe
| 119341 ||  || — || September 19, 2001 || Socorro || LINEAR || — || align=right | 2.4 km || 
|-id=342 bgcolor=#fefefe
| 119342 ||  || — || September 16, 2001 || Socorro || LINEAR || — || align=right | 2.2 km || 
|-id=343 bgcolor=#fefefe
| 119343 ||  || — || September 16, 2001 || Socorro || LINEAR || V || align=right | 1.3 km || 
|-id=344 bgcolor=#fefefe
| 119344 ||  || — || September 17, 2001 || Socorro || LINEAR || — || align=right | 1.9 km || 
|-id=345 bgcolor=#fefefe
| 119345 ||  || — || September 19, 2001 || Socorro || LINEAR || — || align=right | 1.5 km || 
|-id=346 bgcolor=#fefefe
| 119346 ||  || — || September 19, 2001 || Socorro || LINEAR || NYS || align=right | 1.1 km || 
|-id=347 bgcolor=#E9E9E9
| 119347 ||  || — || September 19, 2001 || Socorro || LINEAR || — || align=right | 2.0 km || 
|-id=348 bgcolor=#fefefe
| 119348 ||  || — || September 19, 2001 || Socorro || LINEAR || NYS || align=right | 1.2 km || 
|-id=349 bgcolor=#fefefe
| 119349 ||  || — || September 19, 2001 || Socorro || LINEAR || NYS || align=right | 1.3 km || 
|-id=350 bgcolor=#fefefe
| 119350 ||  || — || September 19, 2001 || Socorro || LINEAR || — || align=right | 1.9 km || 
|-id=351 bgcolor=#fefefe
| 119351 ||  || — || September 19, 2001 || Socorro || LINEAR || NYS || align=right data-sort-value="0.96" | 960 m || 
|-id=352 bgcolor=#fefefe
| 119352 ||  || — || September 19, 2001 || Socorro || LINEAR || V || align=right | 1.00 km || 
|-id=353 bgcolor=#fefefe
| 119353 ||  || — || September 19, 2001 || Socorro || LINEAR || NYS || align=right | 1.1 km || 
|-id=354 bgcolor=#E9E9E9
| 119354 ||  || — || September 19, 2001 || Socorro || LINEAR || — || align=right | 1.7 km || 
|-id=355 bgcolor=#E9E9E9
| 119355 ||  || — || September 19, 2001 || Socorro || LINEAR || AST || align=right | 4.6 km || 
|-id=356 bgcolor=#fefefe
| 119356 ||  || — || September 19, 2001 || Socorro || LINEAR || MAS || align=right | 1.3 km || 
|-id=357 bgcolor=#fefefe
| 119357 ||  || — || September 19, 2001 || Socorro || LINEAR || — || align=right | 2.9 km || 
|-id=358 bgcolor=#E9E9E9
| 119358 ||  || — || September 19, 2001 || Socorro || LINEAR || — || align=right | 1.4 km || 
|-id=359 bgcolor=#E9E9E9
| 119359 ||  || — || September 19, 2001 || Socorro || LINEAR || — || align=right | 1.5 km || 
|-id=360 bgcolor=#E9E9E9
| 119360 ||  || — || September 19, 2001 || Socorro || LINEAR || — || align=right | 1.4 km || 
|-id=361 bgcolor=#E9E9E9
| 119361 ||  || — || September 19, 2001 || Socorro || LINEAR || — || align=right | 4.2 km || 
|-id=362 bgcolor=#fefefe
| 119362 ||  || — || September 19, 2001 || Socorro || LINEAR || V || align=right | 1.4 km || 
|-id=363 bgcolor=#fefefe
| 119363 ||  || — || September 19, 2001 || Socorro || LINEAR || — || align=right | 1.4 km || 
|-id=364 bgcolor=#fefefe
| 119364 ||  || — || September 19, 2001 || Socorro || LINEAR || NYS || align=right | 1.7 km || 
|-id=365 bgcolor=#fefefe
| 119365 ||  || — || September 19, 2001 || Socorro || LINEAR || V || align=right | 1.5 km || 
|-id=366 bgcolor=#E9E9E9
| 119366 ||  || — || September 19, 2001 || Socorro || LINEAR || BRG || align=right | 3.6 km || 
|-id=367 bgcolor=#E9E9E9
| 119367 ||  || — || September 19, 2001 || Socorro || LINEAR || — || align=right | 1.8 km || 
|-id=368 bgcolor=#E9E9E9
| 119368 ||  || — || September 26, 2001 || Socorro || LINEAR || PAL || align=right | 3.5 km || 
|-id=369 bgcolor=#E9E9E9
| 119369 ||  || — || September 21, 2001 || Anderson Mesa || LONEOS || — || align=right | 3.4 km || 
|-id=370 bgcolor=#E9E9E9
| 119370 ||  || — || September 21, 2001 || Palomar || NEAT || — || align=right | 1.9 km || 
|-id=371 bgcolor=#fefefe
| 119371 ||  || — || September 22, 2001 || Palomar || NEAT || — || align=right | 1.9 km || 
|-id=372 bgcolor=#fefefe
| 119372 ||  || — || September 16, 2001 || Socorro || LINEAR || V || align=right | 1.3 km || 
|-id=373 bgcolor=#E9E9E9
| 119373 ||  || — || September 22, 2001 || Socorro || LINEAR || EUN || align=right | 2.4 km || 
|-id=374 bgcolor=#E9E9E9
| 119374 ||  || — || September 19, 2001 || Socorro || LINEAR || — || align=right | 2.1 km || 
|-id=375 bgcolor=#E9E9E9
| 119375 ||  || — || September 25, 2001 || Socorro || LINEAR || EUN || align=right | 2.4 km || 
|-id=376 bgcolor=#E9E9E9
| 119376 ||  || — || September 25, 2001 || Socorro || LINEAR || — || align=right | 3.8 km || 
|-id=377 bgcolor=#E9E9E9
| 119377 ||  || — || September 20, 2001 || Socorro || LINEAR || — || align=right | 2.0 km || 
|-id=378 bgcolor=#fefefe
| 119378 ||  || — || September 25, 2001 || Socorro || LINEAR || — || align=right | 1.7 km || 
|-id=379 bgcolor=#E9E9E9
| 119379 ||  || — || September 25, 2001 || Socorro || LINEAR || — || align=right | 4.2 km || 
|-id=380 bgcolor=#E9E9E9
| 119380 ||  || — || September 16, 2001 || Socorro || LINEAR || — || align=right | 1.9 km || 
|-id=381 bgcolor=#fefefe
| 119381 ||  || — || September 18, 2001 || Anderson Mesa || LONEOS || — || align=right | 1.6 km || 
|-id=382 bgcolor=#fefefe
| 119382 ||  || — || September 25, 2001 || Socorro || LINEAR || — || align=right | 2.0 km || 
|-id=383 bgcolor=#E9E9E9
| 119383 ||  || — || September 21, 2001 || Socorro || LINEAR || — || align=right | 2.4 km || 
|-id=384 bgcolor=#fefefe
| 119384 || 2001 TG || — || October 5, 2001 || Palomar || NEAT || PHO || align=right | 2.8 km || 
|-id=385 bgcolor=#fefefe
| 119385 ||  || — || October 11, 2001 || Desert Eagle || W. K. Y. Yeung || — || align=right | 2.6 km || 
|-id=386 bgcolor=#fefefe
| 119386 ||  || — || October 13, 2001 || Socorro || LINEAR || — || align=right | 1.8 km || 
|-id=387 bgcolor=#fefefe
| 119387 ||  || — || October 13, 2001 || Socorro || LINEAR || — || align=right | 1.3 km || 
|-id=388 bgcolor=#E9E9E9
| 119388 ||  || — || October 13, 2001 || Socorro || LINEAR || — || align=right | 2.2 km || 
|-id=389 bgcolor=#fefefe
| 119389 ||  || — || October 9, 2001 || Socorro || LINEAR || — || align=right | 7.0 km || 
|-id=390 bgcolor=#E9E9E9
| 119390 ||  || — || October 14, 2001 || Socorro || LINEAR || — || align=right | 4.3 km || 
|-id=391 bgcolor=#fefefe
| 119391 ||  || — || October 14, 2001 || Socorro || LINEAR || — || align=right | 1.6 km || 
|-id=392 bgcolor=#E9E9E9
| 119392 ||  || — || October 14, 2001 || Socorro || LINEAR || — || align=right | 3.8 km || 
|-id=393 bgcolor=#fefefe
| 119393 ||  || — || October 14, 2001 || Socorro || LINEAR || V || align=right | 1.5 km || 
|-id=394 bgcolor=#E9E9E9
| 119394 ||  || — || October 14, 2001 || Socorro || LINEAR || EUN || align=right | 2.2 km || 
|-id=395 bgcolor=#E9E9E9
| 119395 ||  || — || October 14, 2001 || Socorro || LINEAR || — || align=right | 5.3 km || 
|-id=396 bgcolor=#E9E9E9
| 119396 ||  || — || October 14, 2001 || Socorro || LINEAR || HNS || align=right | 3.1 km || 
|-id=397 bgcolor=#E9E9E9
| 119397 ||  || — || October 14, 2001 || Socorro || LINEAR || JUN || align=right | 3.5 km || 
|-id=398 bgcolor=#E9E9E9
| 119398 ||  || — || October 15, 2001 || Desert Eagle || W. K. Y. Yeung || — || align=right | 3.4 km || 
|-id=399 bgcolor=#fefefe
| 119399 ||  || — || October 15, 2001 || Desert Eagle || W. K. Y. Yeung || V || align=right | 1.4 km || 
|-id=400 bgcolor=#fefefe
| 119400 ||  || — || October 13, 2001 || Socorro || LINEAR || — || align=right | 2.6 km || 
|}

119401–119500 

|-bgcolor=#fefefe
| 119401 ||  || — || October 13, 2001 || Socorro || LINEAR || MAS || align=right | 1.2 km || 
|-id=402 bgcolor=#E9E9E9
| 119402 ||  || — || October 13, 2001 || Socorro || LINEAR || — || align=right | 2.0 km || 
|-id=403 bgcolor=#fefefe
| 119403 ||  || — || October 13, 2001 || Socorro || LINEAR || NYS || align=right | 1.5 km || 
|-id=404 bgcolor=#fefefe
| 119404 ||  || — || October 13, 2001 || Socorro || LINEAR || V || align=right | 1.9 km || 
|-id=405 bgcolor=#E9E9E9
| 119405 ||  || — || October 13, 2001 || Socorro || LINEAR || — || align=right | 1.7 km || 
|-id=406 bgcolor=#E9E9E9
| 119406 ||  || — || October 13, 2001 || Socorro || LINEAR || — || align=right | 1.9 km || 
|-id=407 bgcolor=#E9E9E9
| 119407 ||  || — || October 13, 2001 || Socorro || LINEAR || — || align=right | 1.7 km || 
|-id=408 bgcolor=#fefefe
| 119408 ||  || — || October 13, 2001 || Socorro || LINEAR || — || align=right | 2.9 km || 
|-id=409 bgcolor=#fefefe
| 119409 ||  || — || October 13, 2001 || Socorro || LINEAR || — || align=right | 2.1 km || 
|-id=410 bgcolor=#fefefe
| 119410 ||  || — || October 13, 2001 || Socorro || LINEAR || — || align=right | 1.6 km || 
|-id=411 bgcolor=#E9E9E9
| 119411 ||  || — || October 13, 2001 || Socorro || LINEAR || — || align=right | 1.5 km || 
|-id=412 bgcolor=#fefefe
| 119412 ||  || — || October 13, 2001 || Socorro || LINEAR || — || align=right | 5.4 km || 
|-id=413 bgcolor=#E9E9E9
| 119413 ||  || — || October 13, 2001 || Socorro || LINEAR || — || align=right | 1.8 km || 
|-id=414 bgcolor=#E9E9E9
| 119414 ||  || — || October 13, 2001 || Socorro || LINEAR || — || align=right | 3.2 km || 
|-id=415 bgcolor=#E9E9E9
| 119415 ||  || — || October 14, 2001 || Socorro || LINEAR || NEM || align=right | 4.1 km || 
|-id=416 bgcolor=#fefefe
| 119416 ||  || — || October 14, 2001 || Socorro || LINEAR || ERI || align=right | 3.4 km || 
|-id=417 bgcolor=#E9E9E9
| 119417 ||  || — || October 14, 2001 || Socorro || LINEAR || AGN || align=right | 2.8 km || 
|-id=418 bgcolor=#fefefe
| 119418 ||  || — || October 14, 2001 || Socorro || LINEAR || NYS || align=right | 3.3 km || 
|-id=419 bgcolor=#E9E9E9
| 119419 ||  || — || October 14, 2001 || Socorro || LINEAR || — || align=right | 2.2 km || 
|-id=420 bgcolor=#E9E9E9
| 119420 ||  || — || October 14, 2001 || Socorro || LINEAR || NEM || align=right | 2.5 km || 
|-id=421 bgcolor=#fefefe
| 119421 ||  || — || October 14, 2001 || Socorro || LINEAR || V || align=right | 1.5 km || 
|-id=422 bgcolor=#E9E9E9
| 119422 ||  || — || October 14, 2001 || Socorro || LINEAR || — || align=right | 2.3 km || 
|-id=423 bgcolor=#E9E9E9
| 119423 ||  || — || October 14, 2001 || Socorro || LINEAR || — || align=right | 1.7 km || 
|-id=424 bgcolor=#E9E9E9
| 119424 ||  || — || October 15, 2001 || Desert Eagle || W. K. Y. Yeung || — || align=right | 2.6 km || 
|-id=425 bgcolor=#fefefe
| 119425 ||  || — || October 13, 2001 || Socorro || LINEAR || — || align=right | 2.4 km || 
|-id=426 bgcolor=#fefefe
| 119426 ||  || — || October 13, 2001 || Socorro || LINEAR || — || align=right | 3.4 km || 
|-id=427 bgcolor=#E9E9E9
| 119427 ||  || — || October 14, 2001 || Socorro || LINEAR || — || align=right | 2.9 km || 
|-id=428 bgcolor=#fefefe
| 119428 ||  || — || October 15, 2001 || Socorro || LINEAR || PHO || align=right | 2.7 km || 
|-id=429 bgcolor=#E9E9E9
| 119429 ||  || — || October 12, 2001 || Haleakala || NEAT || — || align=right | 3.1 km || 
|-id=430 bgcolor=#E9E9E9
| 119430 ||  || — || October 12, 2001 || Haleakala || NEAT || — || align=right | 1.6 km || 
|-id=431 bgcolor=#E9E9E9
| 119431 ||  || — || October 12, 2001 || Haleakala || NEAT || — || align=right | 3.5 km || 
|-id=432 bgcolor=#fefefe
| 119432 ||  || — || October 11, 2001 || Palomar || NEAT || — || align=right | 1.5 km || 
|-id=433 bgcolor=#E9E9E9
| 119433 ||  || — || October 12, 2001 || Haleakala || NEAT || — || align=right | 2.2 km || 
|-id=434 bgcolor=#E9E9E9
| 119434 ||  || — || October 12, 2001 || Haleakala || NEAT || — || align=right | 2.0 km || 
|-id=435 bgcolor=#E9E9E9
| 119435 ||  || — || October 12, 2001 || Haleakala || NEAT || — || align=right | 6.6 km || 
|-id=436 bgcolor=#E9E9E9
| 119436 ||  || — || October 13, 2001 || Palomar || NEAT || — || align=right | 3.9 km || 
|-id=437 bgcolor=#fefefe
| 119437 ||  || — || October 14, 2001 || Palomar || NEAT || — || align=right | 1.5 km || 
|-id=438 bgcolor=#fefefe
| 119438 ||  || — || October 10, 2001 || Palomar || NEAT || V || align=right | 1.4 km || 
|-id=439 bgcolor=#fefefe
| 119439 ||  || — || October 10, 2001 || Palomar || NEAT || V || align=right | 1.5 km || 
|-id=440 bgcolor=#fefefe
| 119440 ||  || — || October 10, 2001 || Palomar || NEAT || — || align=right | 1.3 km || 
|-id=441 bgcolor=#fefefe
| 119441 ||  || — || October 10, 2001 || Palomar || NEAT || — || align=right | 3.2 km || 
|-id=442 bgcolor=#fefefe
| 119442 ||  || — || October 10, 2001 || Palomar || NEAT || V || align=right | 1.6 km || 
|-id=443 bgcolor=#E9E9E9
| 119443 ||  || — || October 10, 2001 || Palomar || NEAT || EUN || align=right | 2.1 km || 
|-id=444 bgcolor=#fefefe
| 119444 ||  || — || October 10, 2001 || Palomar || NEAT || V || align=right | 1.6 km || 
|-id=445 bgcolor=#fefefe
| 119445 ||  || — || October 15, 2001 || Palomar || NEAT || — || align=right | 2.6 km || 
|-id=446 bgcolor=#E9E9E9
| 119446 ||  || — || October 15, 2001 || Palomar || NEAT || — || align=right | 1.9 km || 
|-id=447 bgcolor=#E9E9E9
| 119447 ||  || — || October 11, 2001 || Palomar || NEAT || — || align=right | 1.7 km || 
|-id=448 bgcolor=#E9E9E9
| 119448 ||  || — || October 15, 2001 || Socorro || LINEAR || — || align=right | 2.3 km || 
|-id=449 bgcolor=#E9E9E9
| 119449 ||  || — || October 15, 2001 || Palomar || NEAT || JUN || align=right | 2.5 km || 
|-id=450 bgcolor=#E9E9E9
| 119450 ||  || — || October 15, 2001 || Socorro || LINEAR || — || align=right | 2.3 km || 
|-id=451 bgcolor=#E9E9E9
| 119451 ||  || — || October 14, 2001 || Socorro || LINEAR || — || align=right | 2.1 km || 
|-id=452 bgcolor=#fefefe
| 119452 ||  || — || October 14, 2001 || Socorro || LINEAR || — || align=right | 2.9 km || 
|-id=453 bgcolor=#E9E9E9
| 119453 ||  || — || October 14, 2001 || Socorro || LINEAR || — || align=right | 2.3 km || 
|-id=454 bgcolor=#E9E9E9
| 119454 ||  || — || October 14, 2001 || Socorro || LINEAR || — || align=right | 2.3 km || 
|-id=455 bgcolor=#fefefe
| 119455 ||  || — || October 14, 2001 || Socorro || LINEAR || FLO || align=right | 1.5 km || 
|-id=456 bgcolor=#E9E9E9
| 119456 ||  || — || October 14, 2001 || Socorro || LINEAR || WIT || align=right | 2.0 km || 
|-id=457 bgcolor=#E9E9E9
| 119457 ||  || — || October 14, 2001 || Socorro || LINEAR || — || align=right | 2.7 km || 
|-id=458 bgcolor=#E9E9E9
| 119458 ||  || — || October 14, 2001 || Socorro || LINEAR || — || align=right | 2.0 km || 
|-id=459 bgcolor=#E9E9E9
| 119459 ||  || — || October 14, 2001 || Socorro || LINEAR || HNS || align=right | 2.8 km || 
|-id=460 bgcolor=#E9E9E9
| 119460 ||  || — || October 15, 2001 || Socorro || LINEAR || — || align=right | 1.9 km || 
|-id=461 bgcolor=#fefefe
| 119461 ||  || — || October 11, 2001 || Socorro || LINEAR || FLO || align=right | 1.3 km || 
|-id=462 bgcolor=#fefefe
| 119462 ||  || — || October 11, 2001 || Socorro || LINEAR || V || align=right | 1.5 km || 
|-id=463 bgcolor=#E9E9E9
| 119463 ||  || — || October 11, 2001 || Kitt Peak || Spacewatch || — || align=right | 2.2 km || 
|-id=464 bgcolor=#E9E9E9
| 119464 ||  || — || October 14, 2001 || Haleakala || NEAT || — || align=right | 1.9 km || 
|-id=465 bgcolor=#E9E9E9
| 119465 ||  || — || October 15, 2001 || Palomar || NEAT || EUN || align=right | 2.6 km || 
|-id=466 bgcolor=#E9E9E9
| 119466 ||  || — || October 18, 2001 || Desert Eagle || W. K. Y. Yeung || — || align=right | 1.9 km || 
|-id=467 bgcolor=#E9E9E9
| 119467 ||  || — || October 18, 2001 || Desert Eagle || W. K. Y. Yeung || — || align=right | 2.0 km || 
|-id=468 bgcolor=#fefefe
| 119468 ||  || — || October 17, 2001 || Socorro || LINEAR || — || align=right | 3.4 km || 
|-id=469 bgcolor=#E9E9E9
| 119469 ||  || — || October 22, 2001 || Desert Eagle || W. K. Y. Yeung || — || align=right | 3.1 km || 
|-id=470 bgcolor=#E9E9E9
| 119470 ||  || — || October 24, 2001 || Desert Eagle || W. K. Y. Yeung || — || align=right | 2.9 km || 
|-id=471 bgcolor=#E9E9E9
| 119471 ||  || — || October 24, 2001 || Desert Eagle || W. K. Y. Yeung || — || align=right | 3.7 km || 
|-id=472 bgcolor=#fefefe
| 119472 ||  || — || October 25, 2001 || Farpoint || G. Hug || — || align=right | 2.5 km || 
|-id=473 bgcolor=#C2E0FF
| 119473 ||  || — || October 19, 2001 || Kitt Peak || M. W. Buie || plutino || align=right | 105 km || 
|-id=474 bgcolor=#fefefe
| 119474 ||  || — || October 16, 2001 || Palomar || NEAT || V || align=right | 1.2 km || 
|-id=475 bgcolor=#fefefe
| 119475 ||  || — || October 16, 2001 || Socorro || LINEAR || — || align=right | 2.7 km || 
|-id=476 bgcolor=#fefefe
| 119476 ||  || — || October 16, 2001 || Socorro || LINEAR || — || align=right | 1.8 km || 
|-id=477 bgcolor=#fefefe
| 119477 ||  || — || October 16, 2001 || Socorro || LINEAR || — || align=right | 1.7 km || 
|-id=478 bgcolor=#fefefe
| 119478 ||  || — || October 16, 2001 || Socorro || LINEAR || NYS || align=right | 1.7 km || 
|-id=479 bgcolor=#fefefe
| 119479 ||  || — || October 16, 2001 || Socorro || LINEAR || V || align=right | 1.3 km || 
|-id=480 bgcolor=#E9E9E9
| 119480 ||  || — || October 16, 2001 || Socorro || LINEAR || — || align=right | 1.6 km || 
|-id=481 bgcolor=#E9E9E9
| 119481 ||  || — || October 16, 2001 || Socorro || LINEAR || — || align=right | 2.0 km || 
|-id=482 bgcolor=#E9E9E9
| 119482 ||  || — || October 17, 2001 || Socorro || LINEAR || — || align=right | 1.4 km || 
|-id=483 bgcolor=#E9E9E9
| 119483 ||  || — || October 17, 2001 || Socorro || LINEAR || — || align=right | 2.8 km || 
|-id=484 bgcolor=#E9E9E9
| 119484 ||  || — || October 17, 2001 || Socorro || LINEAR || EUN || align=right | 2.8 km || 
|-id=485 bgcolor=#E9E9E9
| 119485 ||  || — || October 17, 2001 || Socorro || LINEAR || — || align=right | 2.4 km || 
|-id=486 bgcolor=#fefefe
| 119486 ||  || — || October 16, 2001 || Socorro || LINEAR || NYS || align=right | 1.5 km || 
|-id=487 bgcolor=#E9E9E9
| 119487 ||  || — || October 17, 2001 || Socorro || LINEAR || — || align=right | 2.1 km || 
|-id=488 bgcolor=#E9E9E9
| 119488 ||  || — || October 17, 2001 || Socorro || LINEAR || — || align=right | 2.3 km || 
|-id=489 bgcolor=#E9E9E9
| 119489 ||  || — || October 18, 2001 || Socorro || LINEAR || KON || align=right | 4.9 km || 
|-id=490 bgcolor=#fefefe
| 119490 ||  || — || October 20, 2001 || Socorro || LINEAR || MAS || align=right | 1.5 km || 
|-id=491 bgcolor=#E9E9E9
| 119491 ||  || — || October 20, 2001 || Haleakala || NEAT || EUN || align=right | 2.7 km || 
|-id=492 bgcolor=#fefefe
| 119492 ||  || — || October 20, 2001 || Socorro || LINEAR || — || align=right | 1.5 km || 
|-id=493 bgcolor=#E9E9E9
| 119493 ||  || — || October 20, 2001 || Socorro || LINEAR || — || align=right | 2.8 km || 
|-id=494 bgcolor=#E9E9E9
| 119494 ||  || — || October 20, 2001 || Socorro || LINEAR || — || align=right | 2.0 km || 
|-id=495 bgcolor=#E9E9E9
| 119495 ||  || — || October 20, 2001 || Socorro || LINEAR || — || align=right | 2.2 km || 
|-id=496 bgcolor=#E9E9E9
| 119496 ||  || — || October 19, 2001 || Haleakala || NEAT || — || align=right | 2.2 km || 
|-id=497 bgcolor=#E9E9E9
| 119497 ||  || — || October 20, 2001 || Socorro || LINEAR || — || align=right | 3.6 km || 
|-id=498 bgcolor=#fefefe
| 119498 ||  || — || October 20, 2001 || Socorro || LINEAR || — || align=right | 3.8 km || 
|-id=499 bgcolor=#E9E9E9
| 119499 ||  || — || October 22, 2001 || Socorro || LINEAR || — || align=right | 1.8 km || 
|-id=500 bgcolor=#d6d6d6
| 119500 ||  || — || October 22, 2001 || Socorro || LINEAR || — || align=right | 4.3 km || 
|}

119501–119600 

|-bgcolor=#fefefe
| 119501 ||  || — || October 22, 2001 || Socorro || LINEAR || — || align=right | 2.1 km || 
|-id=502 bgcolor=#E9E9E9
| 119502 ||  || — || October 22, 2001 || Socorro || LINEAR || — || align=right | 2.7 km || 
|-id=503 bgcolor=#fefefe
| 119503 ||  || — || October 22, 2001 || Palomar || NEAT || — || align=right | 4.5 km || 
|-id=504 bgcolor=#E9E9E9
| 119504 ||  || — || October 17, 2001 || Socorro || LINEAR || — || align=right | 2.2 km || 
|-id=505 bgcolor=#E9E9E9
| 119505 ||  || — || October 17, 2001 || Socorro || LINEAR || — || align=right | 2.7 km || 
|-id=506 bgcolor=#E9E9E9
| 119506 ||  || — || October 20, 2001 || Socorro || LINEAR || — || align=right | 1.9 km || 
|-id=507 bgcolor=#E9E9E9
| 119507 ||  || — || October 20, 2001 || Socorro || LINEAR || — || align=right | 2.9 km || 
|-id=508 bgcolor=#E9E9E9
| 119508 ||  || — || October 20, 2001 || Socorro || LINEAR || EUN || align=right | 2.3 km || 
|-id=509 bgcolor=#fefefe
| 119509 ||  || — || October 21, 2001 || Socorro || LINEAR || NYS || align=right | 4.3 km || 
|-id=510 bgcolor=#E9E9E9
| 119510 ||  || — || October 21, 2001 || Socorro || LINEAR || — || align=right | 2.3 km || 
|-id=511 bgcolor=#E9E9E9
| 119511 ||  || — || October 21, 2001 || Socorro || LINEAR || — || align=right | 2.3 km || 
|-id=512 bgcolor=#E9E9E9
| 119512 ||  || — || October 22, 2001 || Socorro || LINEAR || — || align=right | 2.0 km || 
|-id=513 bgcolor=#fefefe
| 119513 ||  || — || October 23, 2001 || Socorro || LINEAR || MAS || align=right | 1.4 km || 
|-id=514 bgcolor=#E9E9E9
| 119514 ||  || — || October 23, 2001 || Socorro || LINEAR || — || align=right | 1.7 km || 
|-id=515 bgcolor=#E9E9E9
| 119515 ||  || — || October 23, 2001 || Socorro || LINEAR || — || align=right | 2.7 km || 
|-id=516 bgcolor=#E9E9E9
| 119516 ||  || — || October 23, 2001 || Socorro || LINEAR || — || align=right | 2.2 km || 
|-id=517 bgcolor=#fefefe
| 119517 ||  || — || October 23, 2001 || Socorro || LINEAR || FLO || align=right | 1.7 km || 
|-id=518 bgcolor=#E9E9E9
| 119518 ||  || — || October 23, 2001 || Socorro || LINEAR || — || align=right | 3.1 km || 
|-id=519 bgcolor=#E9E9E9
| 119519 ||  || — || October 23, 2001 || Socorro || LINEAR || — || align=right | 2.6 km || 
|-id=520 bgcolor=#E9E9E9
| 119520 ||  || — || October 23, 2001 || Socorro || LINEAR || — || align=right | 2.1 km || 
|-id=521 bgcolor=#E9E9E9
| 119521 ||  || — || October 23, 2001 || Socorro || LINEAR || — || align=right | 3.9 km || 
|-id=522 bgcolor=#E9E9E9
| 119522 ||  || — || October 23, 2001 || Socorro || LINEAR || — || align=right | 2.1 km || 
|-id=523 bgcolor=#fefefe
| 119523 ||  || — || October 23, 2001 || Palomar || NEAT || — || align=right | 2.2 km || 
|-id=524 bgcolor=#E9E9E9
| 119524 ||  || — || October 19, 2001 || Socorro || LINEAR || — || align=right | 4.3 km || 
|-id=525 bgcolor=#E9E9E9
| 119525 ||  || — || October 19, 2001 || Socorro || LINEAR || — || align=right | 6.6 km || 
|-id=526 bgcolor=#fefefe
| 119526 ||  || — || October 24, 2001 || Palomar || NEAT || SUL || align=right | 4.8 km || 
|-id=527 bgcolor=#fefefe
| 119527 ||  || — || October 21, 2001 || Socorro || LINEAR || — || align=right | 1.9 km || 
|-id=528 bgcolor=#C2FFFF
| 119528 ||  || — || October 26, 2001 || Haleakala || NEAT || L5 || align=right | 22 km || 
|-id=529 bgcolor=#E9E9E9
| 119529 ||  || — || October 17, 2001 || Socorro || LINEAR || — || align=right | 2.0 km || 
|-id=530 bgcolor=#fefefe
| 119530 ||  || — || November 6, 2001 || Socorro || LINEAR || — || align=right | 2.2 km || 
|-id=531 bgcolor=#E9E9E9
| 119531 ||  || — || November 8, 2001 || Bisei SG Center || BATTeRS || — || align=right | 5.5 km || 
|-id=532 bgcolor=#E9E9E9
| 119532 ||  || — || November 9, 2001 || Socorro || LINEAR || — || align=right | 4.1 km || 
|-id=533 bgcolor=#E9E9E9
| 119533 ||  || — || November 9, 2001 || Socorro || LINEAR || — || align=right | 2.2 km || 
|-id=534 bgcolor=#E9E9E9
| 119534 ||  || — || November 10, 2001 || Socorro || LINEAR || MAR || align=right | 2.6 km || 
|-id=535 bgcolor=#E9E9E9
| 119535 ||  || — || November 10, 2001 || Socorro || LINEAR || — || align=right | 2.6 km || 
|-id=536 bgcolor=#fefefe
| 119536 ||  || — || November 10, 2001 || Socorro || LINEAR || — || align=right | 2.4 km || 
|-id=537 bgcolor=#fefefe
| 119537 ||  || — || November 10, 2001 || Socorro || LINEAR || — || align=right | 2.1 km || 
|-id=538 bgcolor=#E9E9E9
| 119538 ||  || — || November 10, 2001 || Socorro || LINEAR || — || align=right | 4.1 km || 
|-id=539 bgcolor=#E9E9E9
| 119539 ||  || — || November 10, 2001 || Socorro || LINEAR || — || align=right | 4.8 km || 
|-id=540 bgcolor=#E9E9E9
| 119540 ||  || — || November 9, 2001 || Socorro || LINEAR || — || align=right | 2.0 km || 
|-id=541 bgcolor=#fefefe
| 119541 ||  || — || November 9, 2001 || Socorro || LINEAR || — || align=right | 1.7 km || 
|-id=542 bgcolor=#E9E9E9
| 119542 ||  || — || November 9, 2001 || Socorro || LINEAR || — || align=right | 1.6 km || 
|-id=543 bgcolor=#E9E9E9
| 119543 ||  || — || November 9, 2001 || Socorro || LINEAR || MAR || align=right | 2.1 km || 
|-id=544 bgcolor=#E9E9E9
| 119544 ||  || — || November 9, 2001 || Socorro || LINEAR || — || align=right | 5.5 km || 
|-id=545 bgcolor=#E9E9E9
| 119545 ||  || — || November 9, 2001 || Socorro || LINEAR || — || align=right | 2.6 km || 
|-id=546 bgcolor=#E9E9E9
| 119546 ||  || — || November 9, 2001 || Socorro || LINEAR || — || align=right | 4.7 km || 
|-id=547 bgcolor=#E9E9E9
| 119547 ||  || — || November 9, 2001 || Socorro || LINEAR || MAR || align=right | 2.7 km || 
|-id=548 bgcolor=#E9E9E9
| 119548 ||  || — || November 9, 2001 || Socorro || LINEAR || — || align=right | 3.3 km || 
|-id=549 bgcolor=#fefefe
| 119549 ||  || — || November 9, 2001 || Socorro || LINEAR || NYS || align=right | 1.6 km || 
|-id=550 bgcolor=#E9E9E9
| 119550 ||  || — || November 9, 2001 || Socorro || LINEAR || MAR || align=right | 2.3 km || 
|-id=551 bgcolor=#E9E9E9
| 119551 ||  || — || November 9, 2001 || Socorro || LINEAR || EUN || align=right | 4.0 km || 
|-id=552 bgcolor=#E9E9E9
| 119552 ||  || — || November 9, 2001 || Socorro || LINEAR || — || align=right | 2.3 km || 
|-id=553 bgcolor=#E9E9E9
| 119553 ||  || — || November 9, 2001 || Socorro || LINEAR || slow || align=right | 3.3 km || 
|-id=554 bgcolor=#E9E9E9
| 119554 ||  || — || November 9, 2001 || Socorro || LINEAR || — || align=right | 4.1 km || 
|-id=555 bgcolor=#E9E9E9
| 119555 ||  || — || November 9, 2001 || Socorro || LINEAR || — || align=right | 3.7 km || 
|-id=556 bgcolor=#E9E9E9
| 119556 ||  || — || November 9, 2001 || Socorro || LINEAR || MAR || align=right | 2.2 km || 
|-id=557 bgcolor=#E9E9E9
| 119557 ||  || — || November 9, 2001 || Socorro || LINEAR || — || align=right | 2.4 km || 
|-id=558 bgcolor=#E9E9E9
| 119558 ||  || — || November 9, 2001 || Socorro || LINEAR || — || align=right | 2.1 km || 
|-id=559 bgcolor=#E9E9E9
| 119559 ||  || — || November 9, 2001 || Socorro || LINEAR || ADE || align=right | 4.9 km || 
|-id=560 bgcolor=#E9E9E9
| 119560 ||  || — || November 9, 2001 || Socorro || LINEAR || — || align=right | 4.4 km || 
|-id=561 bgcolor=#E9E9E9
| 119561 ||  || — || November 9, 2001 || Socorro || LINEAR || — || align=right | 2.3 km || 
|-id=562 bgcolor=#E9E9E9
| 119562 ||  || — || November 10, 2001 || Socorro || LINEAR || — || align=right | 3.0 km || 
|-id=563 bgcolor=#fefefe
| 119563 ||  || — || November 11, 2001 || Socorro || LINEAR || NYS || align=right | 1.2 km || 
|-id=564 bgcolor=#E9E9E9
| 119564 ||  || — || November 11, 2001 || Socorro || LINEAR || — || align=right | 2.4 km || 
|-id=565 bgcolor=#E9E9E9
| 119565 ||  || — || November 12, 2001 || Kitt Peak || Spacewatch || — || align=right | 1.9 km || 
|-id=566 bgcolor=#fefefe
| 119566 ||  || — || November 12, 2001 || Kitt Peak || Spacewatch || V || align=right | 1.4 km || 
|-id=567 bgcolor=#E9E9E9
| 119567 ||  || — || November 9, 2001 || Palomar || NEAT || — || align=right | 6.4 km || 
|-id=568 bgcolor=#E9E9E9
| 119568 ||  || — || November 15, 2001 || Palomar || NEAT || ADE || align=right | 4.0 km || 
|-id=569 bgcolor=#E9E9E9
| 119569 ||  || — || November 10, 2001 || Bergisch Gladbach || W. Bickel || EUN || align=right | 2.7 km || 
|-id=570 bgcolor=#E9E9E9
| 119570 ||  || — || November 11, 2001 || Socorro || LINEAR || — || align=right | 2.4 km || 
|-id=571 bgcolor=#E9E9E9
| 119571 ||  || — || November 12, 2001 || Haleakala || NEAT || — || align=right | 2.1 km || 
|-id=572 bgcolor=#fefefe
| 119572 ||  || — || November 15, 2001 || Palomar || NEAT || — || align=right | 1.5 km || 
|-id=573 bgcolor=#E9E9E9
| 119573 ||  || — || November 15, 2001 || Socorro || LINEAR || — || align=right | 4.4 km || 
|-id=574 bgcolor=#E9E9E9
| 119574 ||  || — || November 15, 2001 || Socorro || LINEAR || — || align=right | 2.5 km || 
|-id=575 bgcolor=#E9E9E9
| 119575 ||  || — || November 15, 2001 || Socorro || LINEAR || — || align=right | 3.3 km || 
|-id=576 bgcolor=#E9E9E9
| 119576 ||  || — || November 15, 2001 || Socorro || LINEAR || EUN || align=right | 2.8 km || 
|-id=577 bgcolor=#E9E9E9
| 119577 ||  || — || November 15, 2001 || Socorro || LINEAR || — || align=right | 4.5 km || 
|-id=578 bgcolor=#E9E9E9
| 119578 ||  || — || November 15, 2001 || Socorro || LINEAR || — || align=right | 4.4 km || 
|-id=579 bgcolor=#E9E9E9
| 119579 ||  || — || November 15, 2001 || Socorro || LINEAR || — || align=right | 2.1 km || 
|-id=580 bgcolor=#E9E9E9
| 119580 ||  || — || November 12, 2001 || Socorro || LINEAR || — || align=right | 3.7 km || 
|-id=581 bgcolor=#E9E9E9
| 119581 ||  || — || November 12, 2001 || Socorro || LINEAR || — || align=right | 2.2 km || 
|-id=582 bgcolor=#E9E9E9
| 119582 ||  || — || November 12, 2001 || Socorro || LINEAR || HEN || align=right | 2.3 km || 
|-id=583 bgcolor=#E9E9E9
| 119583 ||  || — || November 12, 2001 || Socorro || LINEAR || — || align=right | 2.0 km || 
|-id=584 bgcolor=#E9E9E9
| 119584 ||  || — || November 12, 2001 || Socorro || LINEAR || — || align=right | 2.1 km || 
|-id=585 bgcolor=#E9E9E9
| 119585 ||  || — || November 12, 2001 || Socorro || LINEAR || — || align=right | 2.0 km || 
|-id=586 bgcolor=#E9E9E9
| 119586 ||  || — || November 12, 2001 || Socorro || LINEAR || — || align=right | 3.5 km || 
|-id=587 bgcolor=#E9E9E9
| 119587 ||  || — || November 12, 2001 || Socorro || LINEAR || — || align=right | 2.5 km || 
|-id=588 bgcolor=#E9E9E9
| 119588 ||  || — || November 12, 2001 || Socorro || LINEAR || — || align=right | 3.2 km || 
|-id=589 bgcolor=#E9E9E9
| 119589 ||  || — || November 12, 2001 || Socorro || LINEAR || RAF || align=right | 2.2 km || 
|-id=590 bgcolor=#E9E9E9
| 119590 ||  || — || November 12, 2001 || Socorro || LINEAR || — || align=right | 4.1 km || 
|-id=591 bgcolor=#fefefe
| 119591 ||  || — || November 12, 2001 || Socorro || LINEAR || MAS || align=right | 1.8 km || 
|-id=592 bgcolor=#E9E9E9
| 119592 ||  || — || November 15, 2001 || Socorro || LINEAR || — || align=right | 3.8 km || 
|-id=593 bgcolor=#E9E9E9
| 119593 ||  || — || November 14, 2001 || Kitt Peak || Spacewatch || — || align=right | 2.8 km || 
|-id=594 bgcolor=#E9E9E9
| 119594 ||  || — || November 17, 2001 || Socorro || LINEAR || — || align=right | 2.1 km || 
|-id=595 bgcolor=#E9E9E9
| 119595 ||  || — || November 17, 2001 || Socorro || LINEAR || — || align=right | 2.1 km || 
|-id=596 bgcolor=#fefefe
| 119596 ||  || — || November 17, 2001 || Socorro || LINEAR || V || align=right | 1.3 km || 
|-id=597 bgcolor=#E9E9E9
| 119597 ||  || — || November 17, 2001 || Socorro || LINEAR || — || align=right | 4.3 km || 
|-id=598 bgcolor=#E9E9E9
| 119598 ||  || — || November 17, 2001 || Socorro || LINEAR || — || align=right | 3.0 km || 
|-id=599 bgcolor=#E9E9E9
| 119599 ||  || — || November 17, 2001 || Socorro || LINEAR || — || align=right | 2.7 km || 
|-id=600 bgcolor=#E9E9E9
| 119600 ||  || — || November 17, 2001 || Socorro || LINEAR || — || align=right | 3.3 km || 
|}

119601–119700 

|-bgcolor=#E9E9E9
| 119601 ||  || — || November 17, 2001 || Socorro || LINEAR || — || align=right | 2.8 km || 
|-id=602 bgcolor=#E9E9E9
| 119602 Italodimaria ||  ||  || November 24, 2001 || Farra d'Isonzo || Farra d'Isonzo || — || align=right | 2.9 km || 
|-id=603 bgcolor=#E9E9E9
| 119603 ||  || — || November 17, 2001 || Socorro || LINEAR || — || align=right | 1.9 km || 
|-id=604 bgcolor=#E9E9E9
| 119604 ||  || — || November 17, 2001 || Socorro || LINEAR || — || align=right | 2.5 km || 
|-id=605 bgcolor=#E9E9E9
| 119605 ||  || — || November 17, 2001 || Socorro || LINEAR || HEN || align=right | 1.9 km || 
|-id=606 bgcolor=#E9E9E9
| 119606 ||  || — || November 17, 2001 || Socorro || LINEAR || — || align=right | 2.1 km || 
|-id=607 bgcolor=#E9E9E9
| 119607 ||  || — || November 17, 2001 || Socorro || LINEAR || — || align=right | 2.9 km || 
|-id=608 bgcolor=#fefefe
| 119608 ||  || — || November 27, 2001 || Socorro || LINEAR || PHO || align=right | 2.5 km || 
|-id=609 bgcolor=#E9E9E9
| 119609 ||  || — || November 17, 2001 || Socorro || LINEAR || HNS || align=right | 2.1 km || 
|-id=610 bgcolor=#E9E9E9
| 119610 ||  || — || November 17, 2001 || Socorro || LINEAR || — || align=right | 4.5 km || 
|-id=611 bgcolor=#E9E9E9
| 119611 ||  || — || November 17, 2001 || Socorro || LINEAR || — || align=right | 2.2 km || 
|-id=612 bgcolor=#E9E9E9
| 119612 ||  || — || November 17, 2001 || Socorro || LINEAR || — || align=right | 2.0 km || 
|-id=613 bgcolor=#E9E9E9
| 119613 ||  || — || November 17, 2001 || Socorro || LINEAR || — || align=right | 3.0 km || 
|-id=614 bgcolor=#E9E9E9
| 119614 ||  || — || November 17, 2001 || Socorro || LINEAR || — || align=right | 1.7 km || 
|-id=615 bgcolor=#fefefe
| 119615 ||  || — || November 17, 2001 || Socorro || LINEAR || — || align=right | 2.0 km || 
|-id=616 bgcolor=#E9E9E9
| 119616 ||  || — || November 17, 2001 || Socorro || LINEAR || — || align=right | 3.8 km || 
|-id=617 bgcolor=#E9E9E9
| 119617 ||  || — || November 17, 2001 || Socorro || LINEAR || GAL || align=right | 3.7 km || 
|-id=618 bgcolor=#fefefe
| 119618 ||  || — || November 17, 2001 || Socorro || LINEAR || V || align=right | 1.4 km || 
|-id=619 bgcolor=#fefefe
| 119619 ||  || — || November 17, 2001 || Socorro || LINEAR || — || align=right | 2.3 km || 
|-id=620 bgcolor=#fefefe
| 119620 ||  || — || November 18, 2001 || Socorro || LINEAR || V || align=right | 1.5 km || 
|-id=621 bgcolor=#E9E9E9
| 119621 ||  || — || November 18, 2001 || Socorro || LINEAR || — || align=right | 1.5 km || 
|-id=622 bgcolor=#E9E9E9
| 119622 ||  || — || November 17, 2001 || Kitt Peak || Spacewatch || — || align=right | 3.1 km || 
|-id=623 bgcolor=#E9E9E9
| 119623 ||  || — || November 19, 2001 || Socorro || LINEAR || — || align=right | 2.5 km || 
|-id=624 bgcolor=#E9E9E9
| 119624 ||  || — || November 20, 2001 || Socorro || LINEAR || — || align=right | 2.5 km || 
|-id=625 bgcolor=#E9E9E9
| 119625 ||  || — || November 20, 2001 || Socorro || LINEAR || — || align=right | 3.0 km || 
|-id=626 bgcolor=#E9E9E9
| 119626 ||  || — || November 21, 2001 || Socorro || LINEAR || — || align=right | 5.3 km || 
|-id=627 bgcolor=#E9E9E9
| 119627 ||  || — || November 17, 2001 || Socorro || LINEAR || MAR || align=right | 2.5 km || 
|-id=628 bgcolor=#E9E9E9
| 119628 ||  || — || November 16, 2001 || Kitt Peak || Spacewatch || — || align=right | 3.3 km || 
|-id=629 bgcolor=#d6d6d6
| 119629 ||  || — || November 17, 2001 || Kitt Peak || Spacewatch || THM || align=right | 4.1 km || 
|-id=630 bgcolor=#E9E9E9
| 119630 ||  || — || December 5, 2001 || Haleakala || NEAT || — || align=right | 2.4 km || 
|-id=631 bgcolor=#E9E9E9
| 119631 ||  || — || December 7, 2001 || Socorro || LINEAR || — || align=right | 4.5 km || 
|-id=632 bgcolor=#E9E9E9
| 119632 ||  || — || December 8, 2001 || Socorro || LINEAR || — || align=right | 3.8 km || 
|-id=633 bgcolor=#E9E9E9
| 119633 ||  || — || December 9, 2001 || Socorro || LINEAR || — || align=right | 4.4 km || 
|-id=634 bgcolor=#E9E9E9
| 119634 ||  || — || December 13, 2001 || Oaxaca || J. M. Roe || — || align=right | 3.7 km || 
|-id=635 bgcolor=#E9E9E9
| 119635 ||  || — || December 9, 2001 || Socorro || LINEAR || — || align=right | 4.7 km || 
|-id=636 bgcolor=#E9E9E9
| 119636 ||  || — || December 9, 2001 || Socorro || LINEAR || — || align=right | 3.2 km || 
|-id=637 bgcolor=#E9E9E9
| 119637 ||  || — || December 9, 2001 || Socorro || LINEAR || — || align=right | 5.8 km || 
|-id=638 bgcolor=#fefefe
| 119638 ||  || — || December 10, 2001 || Socorro || LINEAR || V || align=right | 1.8 km || 
|-id=639 bgcolor=#E9E9E9
| 119639 ||  || — || December 10, 2001 || Socorro || LINEAR || — || align=right | 6.2 km || 
|-id=640 bgcolor=#E9E9E9
| 119640 ||  || — || December 10, 2001 || Socorro || LINEAR || ADE || align=right | 4.7 km || 
|-id=641 bgcolor=#E9E9E9
| 119641 ||  || — || December 10, 2001 || Socorro || LINEAR || — || align=right | 1.9 km || 
|-id=642 bgcolor=#E9E9E9
| 119642 ||  || — || December 11, 2001 || Socorro || LINEAR || — || align=right | 2.3 km || 
|-id=643 bgcolor=#E9E9E9
| 119643 ||  || — || December 11, 2001 || Socorro || LINEAR || — || align=right | 1.9 km || 
|-id=644 bgcolor=#E9E9E9
| 119644 ||  || — || December 9, 2001 || Socorro || LINEAR || — || align=right | 3.2 km || 
|-id=645 bgcolor=#E9E9E9
| 119645 ||  || — || December 9, 2001 || Socorro || LINEAR || HNS || align=right | 2.1 km || 
|-id=646 bgcolor=#E9E9E9
| 119646 ||  || — || December 9, 2001 || Socorro || LINEAR || — || align=right | 3.0 km || 
|-id=647 bgcolor=#E9E9E9
| 119647 ||  || — || December 9, 2001 || Socorro || LINEAR || — || align=right | 3.5 km || 
|-id=648 bgcolor=#E9E9E9
| 119648 ||  || — || December 9, 2001 || Socorro || LINEAR || — || align=right | 3.1 km || 
|-id=649 bgcolor=#E9E9E9
| 119649 ||  || — || December 9, 2001 || Socorro || LINEAR || — || align=right | 9.1 km || 
|-id=650 bgcolor=#E9E9E9
| 119650 ||  || — || December 14, 2001 || Socorro || LINEAR || — || align=right | 3.9 km || 
|-id=651 bgcolor=#E9E9E9
| 119651 ||  || — || December 10, 2001 || Socorro || LINEAR || — || align=right | 4.1 km || 
|-id=652 bgcolor=#E9E9E9
| 119652 ||  || — || December 10, 2001 || Socorro || LINEAR || — || align=right | 1.7 km || 
|-id=653 bgcolor=#fefefe
| 119653 ||  || — || December 10, 2001 || Socorro || LINEAR || MAS || align=right | 1.2 km || 
|-id=654 bgcolor=#E9E9E9
| 119654 ||  || — || December 10, 2001 || Socorro || LINEAR || — || align=right | 2.0 km || 
|-id=655 bgcolor=#E9E9E9
| 119655 ||  || — || December 10, 2001 || Socorro || LINEAR || — || align=right | 2.4 km || 
|-id=656 bgcolor=#E9E9E9
| 119656 ||  || — || December 10, 2001 || Socorro || LINEAR || — || align=right | 1.9 km || 
|-id=657 bgcolor=#E9E9E9
| 119657 ||  || — || December 10, 2001 || Socorro || LINEAR || — || align=right | 3.2 km || 
|-id=658 bgcolor=#E9E9E9
| 119658 ||  || — || December 10, 2001 || Socorro || LINEAR || — || align=right | 3.2 km || 
|-id=659 bgcolor=#E9E9E9
| 119659 ||  || — || December 10, 2001 || Socorro || LINEAR || — || align=right | 4.3 km || 
|-id=660 bgcolor=#E9E9E9
| 119660 ||  || — || December 10, 2001 || Socorro || LINEAR || — || align=right | 2.6 km || 
|-id=661 bgcolor=#fefefe
| 119661 ||  || — || December 11, 2001 || Socorro || LINEAR || — || align=right | 4.7 km || 
|-id=662 bgcolor=#E9E9E9
| 119662 ||  || — || December 10, 2001 || Socorro || LINEAR || MRX || align=right | 2.2 km || 
|-id=663 bgcolor=#E9E9E9
| 119663 ||  || — || December 10, 2001 || Socorro || LINEAR || — || align=right | 4.7 km || 
|-id=664 bgcolor=#E9E9E9
| 119664 ||  || — || December 10, 2001 || Socorro || LINEAR || EUN || align=right | 2.1 km || 
|-id=665 bgcolor=#E9E9E9
| 119665 ||  || — || December 10, 2001 || Socorro || LINEAR || — || align=right | 4.2 km || 
|-id=666 bgcolor=#E9E9E9
| 119666 ||  || — || December 11, 2001 || Socorro || LINEAR || — || align=right | 2.7 km || 
|-id=667 bgcolor=#E9E9E9
| 119667 ||  || — || December 11, 2001 || Socorro || LINEAR || HNS || align=right | 2.0 km || 
|-id=668 bgcolor=#fefefe
| 119668 ||  || — || December 11, 2001 || Socorro || LINEAR || MAS || align=right | 1.2 km || 
|-id=669 bgcolor=#fefefe
| 119669 ||  || — || December 11, 2001 || Socorro || LINEAR || NYS || align=right | 1.2 km || 
|-id=670 bgcolor=#E9E9E9
| 119670 ||  || — || December 11, 2001 || Socorro || LINEAR || — || align=right | 2.8 km || 
|-id=671 bgcolor=#E9E9E9
| 119671 ||  || — || December 11, 2001 || Socorro || LINEAR || — || align=right | 2.8 km || 
|-id=672 bgcolor=#E9E9E9
| 119672 ||  || — || December 11, 2001 || Socorro || LINEAR || — || align=right | 3.5 km || 
|-id=673 bgcolor=#E9E9E9
| 119673 ||  || — || December 13, 2001 || Socorro || LINEAR || EUN || align=right | 3.3 km || 
|-id=674 bgcolor=#E9E9E9
| 119674 ||  || — || December 10, 2001 || Socorro || LINEAR || — || align=right | 2.1 km || 
|-id=675 bgcolor=#E9E9E9
| 119675 ||  || — || December 10, 2001 || Socorro || LINEAR || — || align=right | 2.4 km || 
|-id=676 bgcolor=#E9E9E9
| 119676 ||  || — || December 10, 2001 || Socorro || LINEAR || — || align=right | 3.9 km || 
|-id=677 bgcolor=#fefefe
| 119677 ||  || — || December 10, 2001 || Socorro || LINEAR || V || align=right | 1.4 km || 
|-id=678 bgcolor=#E9E9E9
| 119678 ||  || — || December 10, 2001 || Socorro || LINEAR || — || align=right | 2.2 km || 
|-id=679 bgcolor=#fefefe
| 119679 ||  || — || December 10, 2001 || Socorro || LINEAR || — || align=right | 4.4 km || 
|-id=680 bgcolor=#E9E9E9
| 119680 ||  || — || December 10, 2001 || Socorro || LINEAR || — || align=right | 4.5 km || 
|-id=681 bgcolor=#E9E9E9
| 119681 ||  || — || December 10, 2001 || Socorro || LINEAR || — || align=right | 3.8 km || 
|-id=682 bgcolor=#E9E9E9
| 119682 ||  || — || December 10, 2001 || Socorro || LINEAR || NEM || align=right | 5.4 km || 
|-id=683 bgcolor=#E9E9E9
| 119683 ||  || — || December 11, 2001 || Socorro || LINEAR || — || align=right | 3.9 km || 
|-id=684 bgcolor=#E9E9E9
| 119684 ||  || — || December 11, 2001 || Socorro || LINEAR || GEF || align=right | 2.2 km || 
|-id=685 bgcolor=#E9E9E9
| 119685 ||  || — || December 13, 2001 || Socorro || LINEAR || — || align=right | 4.4 km || 
|-id=686 bgcolor=#E9E9E9
| 119686 ||  || — || December 13, 2001 || Socorro || LINEAR || — || align=right | 4.8 km || 
|-id=687 bgcolor=#E9E9E9
| 119687 ||  || — || December 14, 2001 || Socorro || LINEAR || — || align=right | 2.8 km || 
|-id=688 bgcolor=#E9E9E9
| 119688 ||  || — || December 14, 2001 || Socorro || LINEAR || — || align=right | 1.6 km || 
|-id=689 bgcolor=#E9E9E9
| 119689 ||  || — || December 14, 2001 || Socorro || LINEAR || — || align=right | 5.2 km || 
|-id=690 bgcolor=#E9E9E9
| 119690 ||  || — || December 14, 2001 || Socorro || LINEAR || — || align=right | 2.9 km || 
|-id=691 bgcolor=#E9E9E9
| 119691 ||  || — || December 14, 2001 || Socorro || LINEAR || — || align=right | 2.7 km || 
|-id=692 bgcolor=#E9E9E9
| 119692 ||  || — || December 14, 2001 || Socorro || LINEAR || — || align=right | 4.0 km || 
|-id=693 bgcolor=#E9E9E9
| 119693 ||  || — || December 14, 2001 || Socorro || LINEAR || — || align=right | 3.7 km || 
|-id=694 bgcolor=#E9E9E9
| 119694 ||  || — || December 14, 2001 || Socorro || LINEAR || — || align=right | 4.2 km || 
|-id=695 bgcolor=#E9E9E9
| 119695 ||  || — || December 14, 2001 || Socorro || LINEAR || NEM || align=right | 3.8 km || 
|-id=696 bgcolor=#fefefe
| 119696 ||  || — || December 14, 2001 || Socorro || LINEAR || MAS || align=right | 1.4 km || 
|-id=697 bgcolor=#fefefe
| 119697 ||  || — || December 14, 2001 || Socorro || LINEAR || NYS || align=right | 3.2 km || 
|-id=698 bgcolor=#E9E9E9
| 119698 ||  || — || December 14, 2001 || Socorro || LINEAR || — || align=right | 5.5 km || 
|-id=699 bgcolor=#E9E9E9
| 119699 ||  || — || December 14, 2001 || Socorro || LINEAR || — || align=right | 2.8 km || 
|-id=700 bgcolor=#E9E9E9
| 119700 ||  || — || December 14, 2001 || Socorro || LINEAR || AGN || align=right | 2.1 km || 
|}

119701–119800 

|-bgcolor=#fefefe
| 119701 ||  || — || December 14, 2001 || Socorro || LINEAR || — || align=right | 1.6 km || 
|-id=702 bgcolor=#E9E9E9
| 119702 ||  || — || December 14, 2001 || Socorro || LINEAR || — || align=right | 4.4 km || 
|-id=703 bgcolor=#E9E9E9
| 119703 ||  || — || December 14, 2001 || Socorro || LINEAR || — || align=right | 3.3 km || 
|-id=704 bgcolor=#E9E9E9
| 119704 ||  || — || December 14, 2001 || Socorro || LINEAR || HEN || align=right | 1.9 km || 
|-id=705 bgcolor=#fefefe
| 119705 ||  || — || December 14, 2001 || Socorro || LINEAR || MAS || align=right | 1.4 km || 
|-id=706 bgcolor=#E9E9E9
| 119706 ||  || — || December 14, 2001 || Socorro || LINEAR || JUN || align=right | 2.0 km || 
|-id=707 bgcolor=#d6d6d6
| 119707 ||  || — || December 14, 2001 || Socorro || LINEAR || — || align=right | 4.1 km || 
|-id=708 bgcolor=#E9E9E9
| 119708 ||  || — || December 14, 2001 || Socorro || LINEAR || — || align=right | 4.3 km || 
|-id=709 bgcolor=#d6d6d6
| 119709 ||  || — || December 14, 2001 || Socorro || LINEAR || KOR || align=right | 2.9 km || 
|-id=710 bgcolor=#fefefe
| 119710 ||  || — || December 14, 2001 || Socorro || LINEAR || — || align=right | 2.0 km || 
|-id=711 bgcolor=#E9E9E9
| 119711 ||  || — || December 14, 2001 || Socorro || LINEAR || — || align=right | 4.5 km || 
|-id=712 bgcolor=#E9E9E9
| 119712 ||  || — || December 14, 2001 || Socorro || LINEAR || DOR || align=right | 4.4 km || 
|-id=713 bgcolor=#E9E9E9
| 119713 ||  || — || December 11, 2001 || Socorro || LINEAR || — || align=right | 2.2 km || 
|-id=714 bgcolor=#E9E9E9
| 119714 ||  || — || December 11, 2001 || Socorro || LINEAR || MRX || align=right | 2.1 km || 
|-id=715 bgcolor=#E9E9E9
| 119715 ||  || — || December 11, 2001 || Socorro || LINEAR || — || align=right | 3.2 km || 
|-id=716 bgcolor=#E9E9E9
| 119716 ||  || — || December 11, 2001 || Socorro || LINEAR || — || align=right | 4.4 km || 
|-id=717 bgcolor=#E9E9E9
| 119717 ||  || — || December 15, 2001 || Socorro || LINEAR || — || align=right | 2.5 km || 
|-id=718 bgcolor=#E9E9E9
| 119718 ||  || — || December 15, 2001 || Socorro || LINEAR || MRX || align=right | 2.2 km || 
|-id=719 bgcolor=#E9E9E9
| 119719 ||  || — || December 15, 2001 || Socorro || LINEAR || — || align=right | 3.6 km || 
|-id=720 bgcolor=#E9E9E9
| 119720 ||  || — || December 15, 2001 || Socorro || LINEAR || — || align=right | 3.9 km || 
|-id=721 bgcolor=#E9E9E9
| 119721 ||  || — || December 15, 2001 || Socorro || LINEAR || — || align=right | 3.7 km || 
|-id=722 bgcolor=#d6d6d6
| 119722 ||  || — || December 15, 2001 || Socorro || LINEAR || — || align=right | 3.9 km || 
|-id=723 bgcolor=#E9E9E9
| 119723 ||  || — || December 15, 2001 || Socorro || LINEAR || HEN || align=right | 2.0 km || 
|-id=724 bgcolor=#E9E9E9
| 119724 ||  || — || December 15, 2001 || Socorro || LINEAR || MAR || align=right | 2.0 km || 
|-id=725 bgcolor=#E9E9E9
| 119725 ||  || — || December 7, 2001 || Socorro || LINEAR || — || align=right | 2.6 km || 
|-id=726 bgcolor=#E9E9E9
| 119726 ||  || — || December 7, 2001 || Socorro || LINEAR || GER || align=right | 2.0 km || 
|-id=727 bgcolor=#E9E9E9
| 119727 ||  || — || December 7, 2001 || Socorro || LINEAR || EUN || align=right | 1.7 km || 
|-id=728 bgcolor=#E9E9E9
| 119728 ||  || — || December 9, 2001 || Anderson Mesa || LONEOS || — || align=right | 3.2 km || 
|-id=729 bgcolor=#E9E9E9
| 119729 ||  || — || December 10, 2001 || Kitt Peak || Spacewatch || — || align=right | 4.6 km || 
|-id=730 bgcolor=#E9E9E9
| 119730 ||  || — || December 17, 2001 || Socorro || LINEAR || — || align=right | 3.7 km || 
|-id=731 bgcolor=#E9E9E9
| 119731 ||  || — || December 17, 2001 || Socorro || LINEAR || XIZ || align=right | 2.7 km || 
|-id=732 bgcolor=#E9E9E9
| 119732 ||  || — || December 17, 2001 || Socorro || LINEAR || — || align=right | 2.6 km || 
|-id=733 bgcolor=#E9E9E9
| 119733 ||  || — || December 17, 2001 || Socorro || LINEAR || HOF || align=right | 5.3 km || 
|-id=734 bgcolor=#E9E9E9
| 119734 ||  || — || December 17, 2001 || Socorro || LINEAR || — || align=right | 4.2 km || 
|-id=735 bgcolor=#E9E9E9
| 119735 ||  || — || December 17, 2001 || Socorro || LINEAR || — || align=right | 4.0 km || 
|-id=736 bgcolor=#E9E9E9
| 119736 ||  || — || December 18, 2001 || Socorro || LINEAR || PAD || align=right | 3.1 km || 
|-id=737 bgcolor=#E9E9E9
| 119737 ||  || — || December 18, 2001 || Socorro || LINEAR || — || align=right | 2.1 km || 
|-id=738 bgcolor=#E9E9E9
| 119738 ||  || — || December 18, 2001 || Socorro || LINEAR || KON || align=right | 5.0 km || 
|-id=739 bgcolor=#E9E9E9
| 119739 ||  || — || December 18, 2001 || Socorro || LINEAR || — || align=right | 2.9 km || 
|-id=740 bgcolor=#E9E9E9
| 119740 ||  || — || December 18, 2001 || Socorro || LINEAR || — || align=right | 4.2 km || 
|-id=741 bgcolor=#E9E9E9
| 119741 ||  || — || December 18, 2001 || Socorro || LINEAR || — || align=right | 3.9 km || 
|-id=742 bgcolor=#E9E9E9
| 119742 ||  || — || December 18, 2001 || Socorro || LINEAR || WIT || align=right | 2.1 km || 
|-id=743 bgcolor=#E9E9E9
| 119743 ||  || — || December 18, 2001 || Socorro || LINEAR || — || align=right | 4.5 km || 
|-id=744 bgcolor=#E9E9E9
| 119744 ||  || — || December 18, 2001 || Socorro || LINEAR || slow || align=right | 2.3 km || 
|-id=745 bgcolor=#E9E9E9
| 119745 ||  || — || December 18, 2001 || Socorro || LINEAR || slow || align=right | 5.2 km || 
|-id=746 bgcolor=#E9E9E9
| 119746 ||  || — || December 18, 2001 || Socorro || LINEAR || — || align=right | 3.0 km || 
|-id=747 bgcolor=#fefefe
| 119747 ||  || — || December 18, 2001 || Socorro || LINEAR || NYS || align=right | 2.0 km || 
|-id=748 bgcolor=#E9E9E9
| 119748 ||  || — || December 18, 2001 || Socorro || LINEAR || — || align=right | 3.9 km || 
|-id=749 bgcolor=#E9E9E9
| 119749 ||  || — || December 18, 2001 || Socorro || LINEAR || HOF || align=right | 4.3 km || 
|-id=750 bgcolor=#E9E9E9
| 119750 ||  || — || December 18, 2001 || Socorro || LINEAR || — || align=right | 3.6 km || 
|-id=751 bgcolor=#E9E9E9
| 119751 ||  || — || December 18, 2001 || Socorro || LINEAR || MIS || align=right | 4.3 km || 
|-id=752 bgcolor=#d6d6d6
| 119752 ||  || — || December 18, 2001 || Socorro || LINEAR || — || align=right | 5.5 km || 
|-id=753 bgcolor=#d6d6d6
| 119753 ||  || — || December 18, 2001 || Socorro || LINEAR || KOR || align=right | 2.4 km || 
|-id=754 bgcolor=#d6d6d6
| 119754 ||  || — || December 17, 2001 || Palomar || NEAT || EOS || align=right | 4.0 km || 
|-id=755 bgcolor=#E9E9E9
| 119755 ||  || — || December 17, 2001 || Socorro || LINEAR || — || align=right | 3.4 km || 
|-id=756 bgcolor=#E9E9E9
| 119756 ||  || — || December 17, 2001 || Socorro || LINEAR || — || align=right | 3.1 km || 
|-id=757 bgcolor=#E9E9E9
| 119757 ||  || — || December 17, 2001 || Socorro || LINEAR || — || align=right | 2.3 km || 
|-id=758 bgcolor=#E9E9E9
| 119758 ||  || — || December 19, 2001 || Socorro || LINEAR || — || align=right | 4.1 km || 
|-id=759 bgcolor=#d6d6d6
| 119759 ||  || — || December 18, 2001 || Palomar || NEAT || HYG || align=right | 6.3 km || 
|-id=760 bgcolor=#E9E9E9
| 119760 ||  || — || December 19, 2001 || Socorro || LINEAR || — || align=right | 3.5 km || 
|-id=761 bgcolor=#E9E9E9
| 119761 ||  || — || December 18, 2001 || Socorro || LINEAR || EUN || align=right | 4.7 km || 
|-id=762 bgcolor=#E9E9E9
| 119762 ||  || — || December 18, 2001 || Socorro || LINEAR || — || align=right | 4.7 km || 
|-id=763 bgcolor=#E9E9E9
| 119763 ||  || — || December 20, 2001 || Socorro || LINEAR || — || align=right | 3.2 km || 
|-id=764 bgcolor=#E9E9E9
| 119764 ||  || — || December 17, 2001 || Socorro || LINEAR || RAF || align=right | 2.7 km || 
|-id=765 bgcolor=#E9E9E9
| 119765 ||  || — || December 17, 2001 || Socorro || LINEAR || — || align=right | 6.5 km || 
|-id=766 bgcolor=#d6d6d6
| 119766 ||  || — || December 17, 2001 || Socorro || LINEAR || — || align=right | 4.1 km || 
|-id=767 bgcolor=#E9E9E9
| 119767 ||  || — || December 18, 2001 || Kitt Peak || Spacewatch || — || align=right | 2.8 km || 
|-id=768 bgcolor=#E9E9E9
| 119768 ||  || — || December 22, 2001 || Socorro || LINEAR || EUN || align=right | 2.6 km || 
|-id=769 bgcolor=#E9E9E9
| 119769 ||  || — || December 22, 2001 || Socorro || LINEAR || — || align=right | 2.2 km || 
|-id=770 bgcolor=#E9E9E9
| 119770 ||  || — || December 22, 2001 || Socorro || LINEAR || EUN || align=right | 2.5 km || 
|-id=771 bgcolor=#E9E9E9
| 119771 ||  || — || December 19, 2001 || Palomar || NEAT || — || align=right | 2.7 km || 
|-id=772 bgcolor=#E9E9E9
| 119772 ||  || — || January 8, 2002 || Oizumi || T. Kobayashi || — || align=right | 3.7 km || 
|-id=773 bgcolor=#d6d6d6
| 119773 ||  || — || January 11, 2002 || Oizumi || T. Kobayashi || URS || align=right | 7.5 km || 
|-id=774 bgcolor=#d6d6d6
| 119774 ||  || — || January 7, 2002 || Anderson Mesa || LONEOS || — || align=right | 5.2 km || 
|-id=775 bgcolor=#d6d6d6
| 119775 ||  || — || January 8, 2002 || Socorro || LINEAR || EMA || align=right | 7.7 km || 
|-id=776 bgcolor=#E9E9E9
| 119776 ||  || — || January 8, 2002 || Socorro || LINEAR || — || align=right | 3.0 km || 
|-id=777 bgcolor=#E9E9E9
| 119777 ||  || — || January 8, 2002 || Socorro || LINEAR || — || align=right | 4.1 km || 
|-id=778 bgcolor=#E9E9E9
| 119778 ||  || — || January 9, 2002 || Socorro || LINEAR || — || align=right | 4.6 km || 
|-id=779 bgcolor=#E9E9E9
| 119779 ||  || — || January 9, 2002 || Socorro || LINEAR || — || align=right | 2.5 km || 
|-id=780 bgcolor=#d6d6d6
| 119780 ||  || — || January 9, 2002 || Socorro || LINEAR || — || align=right | 5.3 km || 
|-id=781 bgcolor=#d6d6d6
| 119781 ||  || — || January 9, 2002 || Socorro || LINEAR || — || align=right | 4.9 km || 
|-id=782 bgcolor=#d6d6d6
| 119782 ||  || — || January 9, 2002 || Socorro || LINEAR || KOR || align=right | 2.4 km || 
|-id=783 bgcolor=#d6d6d6
| 119783 ||  || — || January 9, 2002 || Socorro || LINEAR || KOR || align=right | 3.0 km || 
|-id=784 bgcolor=#d6d6d6
| 119784 ||  || — || January 9, 2002 || Socorro || LINEAR || KOR || align=right | 2.5 km || 
|-id=785 bgcolor=#d6d6d6
| 119785 ||  || — || January 9, 2002 || Socorro || LINEAR || HYG || align=right | 4.9 km || 
|-id=786 bgcolor=#d6d6d6
| 119786 ||  || — || January 11, 2002 || Socorro || LINEAR || EOS || align=right | 3.8 km || 
|-id=787 bgcolor=#d6d6d6
| 119787 ||  || — || January 8, 2002 || Socorro || LINEAR || — || align=right | 4.7 km || 
|-id=788 bgcolor=#E9E9E9
| 119788 ||  || — || January 9, 2002 || Socorro || LINEAR || — || align=right | 4.0 km || 
|-id=789 bgcolor=#d6d6d6
| 119789 ||  || — || January 9, 2002 || Socorro || LINEAR || — || align=right | 5.4 km || 
|-id=790 bgcolor=#E9E9E9
| 119790 ||  || — || January 9, 2002 || Socorro || LINEAR || — || align=right | 4.3 km || 
|-id=791 bgcolor=#E9E9E9
| 119791 ||  || — || January 8, 2002 || Socorro || LINEAR || — || align=right | 4.5 km || 
|-id=792 bgcolor=#d6d6d6
| 119792 ||  || — || January 9, 2002 || Socorro || LINEAR || EOS || align=right | 4.0 km || 
|-id=793 bgcolor=#E9E9E9
| 119793 ||  || — || January 9, 2002 || Socorro || LINEAR || AGN || align=right | 1.9 km || 
|-id=794 bgcolor=#d6d6d6
| 119794 ||  || — || January 9, 2002 || Socorro || LINEAR || KAR || align=right | 2.3 km || 
|-id=795 bgcolor=#E9E9E9
| 119795 ||  || — || January 9, 2002 || Socorro || LINEAR || — || align=right | 3.1 km || 
|-id=796 bgcolor=#fefefe
| 119796 ||  || — || January 9, 2002 || Socorro || LINEAR || NYS || align=right | 1.7 km || 
|-id=797 bgcolor=#E9E9E9
| 119797 ||  || — || January 9, 2002 || Socorro || LINEAR || — || align=right | 2.4 km || 
|-id=798 bgcolor=#d6d6d6
| 119798 ||  || — || January 13, 2002 || Socorro || LINEAR || — || align=right | 3.8 km || 
|-id=799 bgcolor=#E9E9E9
| 119799 ||  || — || January 8, 2002 || Socorro || LINEAR || HOF || align=right | 5.7 km || 
|-id=800 bgcolor=#E9E9E9
| 119800 ||  || — || January 9, 2002 || Socorro || LINEAR || — || align=right | 2.6 km || 
|}

119801–119900 

|-bgcolor=#d6d6d6
| 119801 ||  || — || January 9, 2002 || Socorro || LINEAR || HYG || align=right | 4.5 km || 
|-id=802 bgcolor=#E9E9E9
| 119802 ||  || — || January 9, 2002 || Socorro || LINEAR || AGN || align=right | 2.5 km || 
|-id=803 bgcolor=#E9E9E9
| 119803 ||  || — || January 9, 2002 || Socorro || LINEAR || — || align=right | 3.6 km || 
|-id=804 bgcolor=#E9E9E9
| 119804 ||  || — || January 13, 2002 || Socorro || LINEAR || — || align=right | 2.5 km || 
|-id=805 bgcolor=#E9E9E9
| 119805 ||  || — || January 13, 2002 || Socorro || LINEAR || HEN || align=right | 1.9 km || 
|-id=806 bgcolor=#d6d6d6
| 119806 ||  || — || January 13, 2002 || Socorro || LINEAR || — || align=right | 5.4 km || 
|-id=807 bgcolor=#d6d6d6
| 119807 ||  || — || January 14, 2002 || Socorro || LINEAR || — || align=right | 4.6 km || 
|-id=808 bgcolor=#d6d6d6
| 119808 ||  || — || January 14, 2002 || Socorro || LINEAR || EOS || align=right | 5.9 km || 
|-id=809 bgcolor=#d6d6d6
| 119809 ||  || — || January 14, 2002 || Socorro || LINEAR || — || align=right | 5.3 km || 
|-id=810 bgcolor=#d6d6d6
| 119810 ||  || — || January 14, 2002 || Socorro || LINEAR || — || align=right | 6.3 km || 
|-id=811 bgcolor=#d6d6d6
| 119811 ||  || — || January 14, 2002 || Socorro || LINEAR || — || align=right | 6.8 km || 
|-id=812 bgcolor=#d6d6d6
| 119812 ||  || — || January 13, 2002 || Socorro || LINEAR || THM || align=right | 4.2 km || 
|-id=813 bgcolor=#E9E9E9
| 119813 ||  || — || January 13, 2002 || Socorro || LINEAR || — || align=right | 3.3 km || 
|-id=814 bgcolor=#d6d6d6
| 119814 ||  || — || January 13, 2002 || Socorro || LINEAR || — || align=right | 5.7 km || 
|-id=815 bgcolor=#d6d6d6
| 119815 ||  || — || January 14, 2002 || Socorro || LINEAR || — || align=right | 4.8 km || 
|-id=816 bgcolor=#d6d6d6
| 119816 ||  || — || January 14, 2002 || Socorro || LINEAR || KOR || align=right | 2.6 km || 
|-id=817 bgcolor=#d6d6d6
| 119817 ||  || — || January 14, 2002 || Socorro || LINEAR || THM || align=right | 5.0 km || 
|-id=818 bgcolor=#d6d6d6
| 119818 ||  || — || January 14, 2002 || Socorro || LINEAR || KAR || align=right | 2.2 km || 
|-id=819 bgcolor=#d6d6d6
| 119819 ||  || — || January 14, 2002 || Socorro || LINEAR || — || align=right | 5.3 km || 
|-id=820 bgcolor=#d6d6d6
| 119820 ||  || — || January 14, 2002 || Socorro || LINEAR || THMfast? || align=right | 4.1 km || 
|-id=821 bgcolor=#d6d6d6
| 119821 ||  || — || January 13, 2002 || Socorro || LINEAR || — || align=right | 6.7 km || 
|-id=822 bgcolor=#E9E9E9
| 119822 ||  || — || January 14, 2002 || Socorro || LINEAR || HOF || align=right | 4.6 km || 
|-id=823 bgcolor=#d6d6d6
| 119823 ||  || — || January 22, 2002 || Desert Eagle || W. K. Y. Yeung || — || align=right | 6.4 km || 
|-id=824 bgcolor=#d6d6d6
| 119824 ||  || — || January 20, 2002 || Anderson Mesa || LONEOS || — || align=right | 5.1 km || 
|-id=825 bgcolor=#d6d6d6
| 119825 ||  || — || January 18, 2002 || Socorro || LINEAR || — || align=right | 4.5 km || 
|-id=826 bgcolor=#E9E9E9
| 119826 ||  || — || January 18, 2002 || Socorro || LINEAR || — || align=right | 5.6 km || 
|-id=827 bgcolor=#d6d6d6
| 119827 ||  || — || January 18, 2002 || Socorro || LINEAR || — || align=right | 3.9 km || 
|-id=828 bgcolor=#E9E9E9
| 119828 ||  || — || January 22, 2002 || Socorro || LINEAR || — || align=right | 4.5 km || 
|-id=829 bgcolor=#E9E9E9
| 119829 ||  || — || January 23, 2002 || Socorro || LINEAR || EUN || align=right | 3.8 km || 
|-id=830 bgcolor=#E9E9E9
| 119830 ||  || — || January 23, 2002 || Socorro || LINEAR || — || align=right | 3.4 km || 
|-id=831 bgcolor=#d6d6d6
| 119831 ||  || — || January 19, 2002 || Anderson Mesa || LONEOS || URS || align=right | 6.2 km || 
|-id=832 bgcolor=#E9E9E9
| 119832 ||  || — || February 6, 2002 || Socorro || LINEAR || — || align=right | 5.3 km || 
|-id=833 bgcolor=#d6d6d6
| 119833 ||  || — || February 3, 2002 || Palomar || NEAT || EOS || align=right | 3.6 km || 
|-id=834 bgcolor=#d6d6d6
| 119834 ||  || — || February 3, 2002 || Palomar || NEAT || SAN || align=right | 2.7 km || 
|-id=835 bgcolor=#d6d6d6
| 119835 ||  || — || February 4, 2002 || Palomar || NEAT || — || align=right | 5.2 km || 
|-id=836 bgcolor=#E9E9E9
| 119836 ||  || — || February 8, 2002 || Fountain Hills || C. W. Juels, P. R. Holvorcem || EUN || align=right | 3.1 km || 
|-id=837 bgcolor=#E9E9E9
| 119837 ||  || — || February 8, 2002 || Fountain Hills || C. W. Juels, P. R. Holvorcem || — || align=right | 4.1 km || 
|-id=838 bgcolor=#d6d6d6
| 119838 ||  || — || February 9, 2002 || Desert Eagle || W. K. Y. Yeung || THM || align=right | 3.6 km || 
|-id=839 bgcolor=#d6d6d6
| 119839 ||  || — || February 6, 2002 || Socorro || LINEAR || — || align=right | 3.8 km || 
|-id=840 bgcolor=#E9E9E9
| 119840 ||  || — || February 5, 2002 || Haleakala || NEAT || — || align=right | 2.4 km || 
|-id=841 bgcolor=#E9E9E9
| 119841 ||  || — || February 6, 2002 || Socorro || LINEAR || AGN || align=right | 2.1 km || 
|-id=842 bgcolor=#E9E9E9
| 119842 ||  || — || February 7, 2002 || Socorro || LINEAR || — || align=right | 4.0 km || 
|-id=843 bgcolor=#d6d6d6
| 119843 ||  || — || February 11, 2002 || Desert Eagle || W. K. Y. Yeung || THM || align=right | 4.9 km || 
|-id=844 bgcolor=#d6d6d6
| 119844 ||  || — || February 5, 2002 || Haleakala || NEAT || — || align=right | 8.0 km || 
|-id=845 bgcolor=#d6d6d6
| 119845 ||  || — || February 8, 2002 || Palomar || NEAT || — || align=right | 6.6 km || 
|-id=846 bgcolor=#E9E9E9
| 119846 Goshiina ||  ||  || February 6, 2002 || Goodricke-Pigott || R. A. Tucker || RAF || align=right | 1.8 km || 
|-id=847 bgcolor=#d6d6d6
| 119847 ||  || — || February 3, 2002 || Haleakala || NEAT || ALA || align=right | 7.1 km || 
|-id=848 bgcolor=#d6d6d6
| 119848 ||  || — || February 7, 2002 || Socorro || LINEAR || THM || align=right | 5.3 km || 
|-id=849 bgcolor=#E9E9E9
| 119849 ||  || — || February 6, 2002 || Socorro || LINEAR || — || align=right | 3.8 km || 
|-id=850 bgcolor=#d6d6d6
| 119850 ||  || — || February 6, 2002 || Socorro || LINEAR || — || align=right | 3.3 km || 
|-id=851 bgcolor=#d6d6d6
| 119851 ||  || — || February 6, 2002 || Socorro || LINEAR || EOS || align=right | 3.9 km || 
|-id=852 bgcolor=#d6d6d6
| 119852 ||  || — || February 6, 2002 || Socorro || LINEAR || — || align=right | 5.2 km || 
|-id=853 bgcolor=#E9E9E9
| 119853 ||  || — || February 7, 2002 || Socorro || LINEAR || — || align=right | 1.8 km || 
|-id=854 bgcolor=#d6d6d6
| 119854 ||  || — || February 7, 2002 || Socorro || LINEAR || — || align=right | 6.0 km || 
|-id=855 bgcolor=#d6d6d6
| 119855 ||  || — || February 7, 2002 || Socorro || LINEAR || HYG || align=right | 6.7 km || 
|-id=856 bgcolor=#d6d6d6
| 119856 ||  || — || February 7, 2002 || Socorro || LINEAR || BRA || align=right | 2.7 km || 
|-id=857 bgcolor=#d6d6d6
| 119857 ||  || — || February 7, 2002 || Socorro || LINEAR || THM || align=right | 4.5 km || 
|-id=858 bgcolor=#E9E9E9
| 119858 ||  || — || February 7, 2002 || Socorro || LINEAR || MRX || align=right | 2.1 km || 
|-id=859 bgcolor=#d6d6d6
| 119859 ||  || — || February 7, 2002 || Socorro || LINEAR || — || align=right | 5.4 km || 
|-id=860 bgcolor=#d6d6d6
| 119860 ||  || — || February 7, 2002 || Socorro || LINEAR || KOR || align=right | 2.8 km || 
|-id=861 bgcolor=#d6d6d6
| 119861 ||  || — || February 7, 2002 || Socorro || LINEAR || KAR || align=right | 2.0 km || 
|-id=862 bgcolor=#d6d6d6
| 119862 ||  || — || February 7, 2002 || Socorro || LINEAR || — || align=right | 4.3 km || 
|-id=863 bgcolor=#d6d6d6
| 119863 ||  || — || February 7, 2002 || Socorro || LINEAR || — || align=right | 5.8 km || 
|-id=864 bgcolor=#d6d6d6
| 119864 ||  || — || February 7, 2002 || Socorro || LINEAR || HYG || align=right | 5.4 km || 
|-id=865 bgcolor=#d6d6d6
| 119865 ||  || — || February 8, 2002 || Socorro || LINEAR || — || align=right | 7.1 km || 
|-id=866 bgcolor=#FA8072
| 119866 ||  || — || February 8, 2002 || Socorro || LINEAR || — || align=right | 3.0 km || 
|-id=867 bgcolor=#d6d6d6
| 119867 ||  || — || February 9, 2002 || Socorro || LINEAR || — || align=right | 4.2 km || 
|-id=868 bgcolor=#d6d6d6
| 119868 ||  || — || February 10, 2002 || Socorro || LINEAR || — || align=right | 3.2 km || 
|-id=869 bgcolor=#d6d6d6
| 119869 ||  || — || February 8, 2002 || Socorro || LINEAR || HYG || align=right | 4.8 km || 
|-id=870 bgcolor=#d6d6d6
| 119870 ||  || — || February 8, 2002 || Socorro || LINEAR || — || align=right | 4.7 km || 
|-id=871 bgcolor=#d6d6d6
| 119871 ||  || — || February 8, 2002 || Socorro || LINEAR || — || align=right | 6.7 km || 
|-id=872 bgcolor=#d6d6d6
| 119872 ||  || — || February 8, 2002 || Socorro || LINEAR || EOS || align=right | 4.5 km || 
|-id=873 bgcolor=#d6d6d6
| 119873 ||  || — || February 8, 2002 || Socorro || LINEAR || HYG || align=right | 6.3 km || 
|-id=874 bgcolor=#d6d6d6
| 119874 ||  || — || February 8, 2002 || Socorro || LINEAR || ALA || align=right | 6.0 km || 
|-id=875 bgcolor=#d6d6d6
| 119875 ||  || — || February 8, 2002 || Socorro || LINEAR || HYG || align=right | 5.9 km || 
|-id=876 bgcolor=#d6d6d6
| 119876 ||  || — || February 10, 2002 || Socorro || LINEAR || THM || align=right | 3.9 km || 
|-id=877 bgcolor=#d6d6d6
| 119877 ||  || — || February 10, 2002 || Socorro || LINEAR || — || align=right | 5.1 km || 
|-id=878 bgcolor=#C2E0FF
| 119878 ||  || — || February 7, 2002 || Kitt Peak || M. W. Buie || res5:12critical || align=right | 259 km || 
|-id=879 bgcolor=#d6d6d6
| 119879 ||  || — || February 11, 2002 || Socorro || LINEAR || — || align=right | 4.6 km || 
|-id=880 bgcolor=#d6d6d6
| 119880 ||  || — || February 11, 2002 || Socorro || LINEAR || — || align=right | 5.2 km || 
|-id=881 bgcolor=#d6d6d6
| 119881 ||  || — || February 11, 2002 || Socorro || LINEAR || — || align=right | 5.7 km || 
|-id=882 bgcolor=#E9E9E9
| 119882 ||  || — || February 11, 2002 || Socorro || LINEAR || HEN || align=right | 2.5 km || 
|-id=883 bgcolor=#E9E9E9
| 119883 ||  || — || February 11, 2002 || Socorro || LINEAR || 526 || align=right | 6.6 km || 
|-id=884 bgcolor=#d6d6d6
| 119884 ||  || — || February 11, 2002 || Socorro || LINEAR || ALA || align=right | 7.1 km || 
|-id=885 bgcolor=#d6d6d6
| 119885 ||  || — || February 13, 2002 || Socorro || LINEAR || — || align=right | 7.9 km || 
|-id=886 bgcolor=#d6d6d6
| 119886 ||  || — || February 15, 2002 || Socorro || LINEAR || TEL || align=right | 2.4 km || 
|-id=887 bgcolor=#E9E9E9
| 119887 ||  || — || February 4, 2002 || Anderson Mesa || LONEOS || — || align=right | 2.2 km || 
|-id=888 bgcolor=#d6d6d6
| 119888 ||  || — || February 6, 2002 || Kitt Peak || Spacewatch || KOR || align=right | 2.4 km || 
|-id=889 bgcolor=#d6d6d6
| 119889 ||  || — || February 6, 2002 || Anderson Mesa || LONEOS || — || align=right | 6.4 km || 
|-id=890 bgcolor=#d6d6d6
| 119890 Zamka ||  ||  || February 6, 2002 || Kitt Peak || M. W. Buie || KOR || align=right | 2.3 km || 
|-id=891 bgcolor=#E9E9E9
| 119891 ||  || — || February 7, 2002 || Haleakala || NEAT || — || align=right | 4.0 km || 
|-id=892 bgcolor=#d6d6d6
| 119892 ||  || — || February 7, 2002 || Palomar || NEAT || — || align=right | 5.5 km || 
|-id=893 bgcolor=#d6d6d6
| 119893 ||  || — || February 8, 2002 || Anderson Mesa || LONEOS || EOS || align=right | 5.1 km || 
|-id=894 bgcolor=#d6d6d6
| 119894 ||  || — || February 8, 2002 || Anderson Mesa || LONEOS || EOS || align=right | 4.7 km || 
|-id=895 bgcolor=#d6d6d6
| 119895 ||  || — || February 8, 2002 || Anderson Mesa || LONEOS || — || align=right | 8.0 km || 
|-id=896 bgcolor=#d6d6d6
| 119896 ||  || — || February 8, 2002 || Kitt Peak || Spacewatch || — || align=right | 4.0 km || 
|-id=897 bgcolor=#d6d6d6
| 119897 ||  || — || February 7, 2002 || Palomar || NEAT || — || align=right | 4.3 km || 
|-id=898 bgcolor=#d6d6d6
| 119898 ||  || — || February 10, 2002 || Socorro || LINEAR || — || align=right | 7.7 km || 
|-id=899 bgcolor=#d6d6d6
| 119899 ||  || — || February 12, 2002 || Socorro || LINEAR || — || align=right | 5.6 km || 
|-id=900 bgcolor=#d6d6d6
| 119900 ||  || — || February 6, 2002 || Palomar || NEAT || — || align=right | 3.7 km || 
|}

119901–120000 

|-bgcolor=#d6d6d6
| 119901 ||  || — || February 6, 2002 || Socorro || LINEAR || — || align=right | 6.7 km || 
|-id=902 bgcolor=#E9E9E9
| 119902 ||  || — || February 19, 2002 || Socorro || LINEAR || EUN || align=right | 3.0 km || 
|-id=903 bgcolor=#d6d6d6
| 119903 ||  || — || March 12, 2002 || Farpoint || G. Hug || SYL7:4 || align=right | 7.3 km || 
|-id=904 bgcolor=#d6d6d6
| 119904 ||  || — || March 6, 2002 || Siding Spring || R. H. McNaught || HIL3:2 || align=right | 7.7 km || 
|-id=905 bgcolor=#FA8072
| 119905 ||  || — || March 14, 2002 || Palomar || NEAT || — || align=right | 5.1 km || 
|-id=906 bgcolor=#d6d6d6
| 119906 ||  || — || March 11, 2002 || Palomar || NEAT || — || align=right | 6.3 km || 
|-id=907 bgcolor=#E9E9E9
| 119907 ||  || — || March 14, 2002 || Desert Eagle || W. K. Y. Yeung || — || align=right | 1.9 km || 
|-id=908 bgcolor=#d6d6d6
| 119908 ||  || — || March 5, 2002 || Kitt Peak || Spacewatch || HYG || align=right | 4.2 km || 
|-id=909 bgcolor=#d6d6d6
| 119909 ||  || — || March 9, 2002 || Socorro || LINEAR || — || align=right | 7.3 km || 
|-id=910 bgcolor=#d6d6d6
| 119910 ||  || — || March 9, 2002 || Socorro || LINEAR || THM || align=right | 6.4 km || 
|-id=911 bgcolor=#d6d6d6
| 119911 ||  || — || March 10, 2002 || Socorro || LINEAR || — || align=right | 3.8 km || 
|-id=912 bgcolor=#E9E9E9
| 119912 ||  || — || March 12, 2002 || Kitt Peak || Spacewatch || — || align=right | 4.5 km || 
|-id=913 bgcolor=#d6d6d6
| 119913 ||  || — || March 13, 2002 || Socorro || LINEAR || — || align=right | 3.9 km || 
|-id=914 bgcolor=#d6d6d6
| 119914 ||  || — || March 13, 2002 || Socorro || LINEAR || — || align=right | 5.6 km || 
|-id=915 bgcolor=#d6d6d6
| 119915 ||  || — || March 10, 2002 || Haleakala || NEAT || EOS || align=right | 4.0 km || 
|-id=916 bgcolor=#d6d6d6
| 119916 ||  || — || March 9, 2002 || Socorro || LINEAR || — || align=right | 4.8 km || 
|-id=917 bgcolor=#d6d6d6
| 119917 ||  || — || March 9, 2002 || Socorro || LINEAR || THM || align=right | 3.4 km || 
|-id=918 bgcolor=#d6d6d6
| 119918 ||  || — || March 9, 2002 || Socorro || LINEAR || SHU3:2 || align=right | 10 km || 
|-id=919 bgcolor=#d6d6d6
| 119919 ||  || — || March 9, 2002 || Socorro || LINEAR || THM || align=right | 3.5 km || 
|-id=920 bgcolor=#d6d6d6
| 119920 ||  || — || March 9, 2002 || Socorro || LINEAR || — || align=right | 4.5 km || 
|-id=921 bgcolor=#d6d6d6
| 119921 ||  || — || March 6, 2002 || Socorro || LINEAR || EMA || align=right | 9.2 km || 
|-id=922 bgcolor=#d6d6d6
| 119922 ||  || — || March 10, 2002 || Kitt Peak || Spacewatch || SHU3:2 || align=right | 12 km || 
|-id=923 bgcolor=#d6d6d6
| 119923 ||  || — || March 11, 2002 || Palomar || NEAT || EOS || align=right | 4.0 km || 
|-id=924 bgcolor=#d6d6d6
| 119924 ||  || — || March 12, 2002 || Palomar || NEAT || — || align=right | 5.1 km || 
|-id=925 bgcolor=#d6d6d6
| 119925 ||  || — || March 12, 2002 || Anderson Mesa || LONEOS || — || align=right | 5.8 km || 
|-id=926 bgcolor=#d6d6d6
| 119926 ||  || — || March 13, 2002 || Palomar || NEAT || EMA || align=right | 5.1 km || 
|-id=927 bgcolor=#d6d6d6
| 119927 ||  || — || March 14, 2002 || Palomar || NEAT || — || align=right | 6.5 km || 
|-id=928 bgcolor=#d6d6d6
| 119928 ||  || — || March 12, 2002 || Palomar || NEAT || — || align=right | 4.7 km || 
|-id=929 bgcolor=#d6d6d6
| 119929 ||  || — || March 24, 2002 || Kvistaberg || UDAS || URS || align=right | 7.2 km || 
|-id=930 bgcolor=#d6d6d6
| 119930 ||  || — || March 20, 2002 || Socorro || LINEAR || ALA || align=right | 7.0 km || 
|-id=931 bgcolor=#d6d6d6
| 119931 ||  || — || March 20, 2002 || Socorro || LINEAR || HYG || align=right | 5.7 km || 
|-id=932 bgcolor=#d6d6d6
| 119932 ||  || — || March 30, 2002 || Palomar || NEAT || — || align=right | 3.9 km || 
|-id=933 bgcolor=#d6d6d6
| 119933 || 2002 GN || — || April 3, 2002 || Kvistaberg || UDAS || — || align=right | 6.8 km || 
|-id=934 bgcolor=#E9E9E9
| 119934 ||  || — || April 10, 2002 || Palomar || NEAT || POS || align=right | 6.2 km || 
|-id=935 bgcolor=#d6d6d6
| 119935 ||  || — || April 15, 2002 || Palomar || NEAT || SHU3:2 || align=right | 6.5 km || 
|-id=936 bgcolor=#d6d6d6
| 119936 ||  || — || April 15, 2002 || Kitt Peak || Spacewatch || 7:4 || align=right | 5.9 km || 
|-id=937 bgcolor=#d6d6d6
| 119937 ||  || — || April 5, 2002 || Palomar || NEAT || EOS || align=right | 4.1 km || 
|-id=938 bgcolor=#d6d6d6
| 119938 ||  || — || April 5, 2002 || Palomar || NEAT || — || align=right | 4.8 km || 
|-id=939 bgcolor=#d6d6d6
| 119939 ||  || — || April 8, 2002 || Palomar || NEAT || — || align=right | 6.6 km || 
|-id=940 bgcolor=#E9E9E9
| 119940 ||  || — || April 10, 2002 || Palomar || NEAT || — || align=right | 3.0 km || 
|-id=941 bgcolor=#d6d6d6
| 119941 ||  || — || April 11, 2002 || Anderson Mesa || LONEOS || — || align=right | 4.7 km || 
|-id=942 bgcolor=#d6d6d6
| 119942 ||  || — || April 12, 2002 || Socorro || LINEAR || 3:2 || align=right | 7.2 km || 
|-id=943 bgcolor=#d6d6d6
| 119943 ||  || — || April 14, 2002 || Socorro || LINEAR || — || align=right | 4.3 km || 
|-id=944 bgcolor=#d6d6d6
| 119944 ||  || — || April 10, 2002 || Socorro || LINEAR || 3:2 || align=right | 10 km || 
|-id=945 bgcolor=#d6d6d6
| 119945 ||  || — || May 4, 2002 || Desert Eagle || W. K. Y. Yeung || 3:2 || align=right | 8.4 km || 
|-id=946 bgcolor=#d6d6d6
| 119946 ||  || — || May 9, 2002 || Socorro || LINEAR || HIL3:2 || align=right | 13 km || 
|-id=947 bgcolor=#d6d6d6
| 119947 ||  || — || May 8, 2002 || Socorro || LINEAR || — || align=right | 4.3 km || 
|-id=948 bgcolor=#E9E9E9
| 119948 ||  || — || May 5, 2002 || Palomar || NEAT || — || align=right | 3.7 km || 
|-id=949 bgcolor=#d6d6d6
| 119949 || 2002 KD || — || May 16, 2002 || Fountain Hills || Fountain Hills Obs. || — || align=right | 5.7 km || 
|-id=950 bgcolor=#d6d6d6
| 119950 ||  || — || May 16, 2002 || Haleakala || NEAT || 3:2 || align=right | 9.1 km || 
|-id=951 bgcolor=#C2E0FF
| 119951 ||  || — || May 17, 2002 || Palomar || C. Trujillo, M. E. Brown || other TNOcritical || align=right | 509 km || 
|-id=952 bgcolor=#d6d6d6
| 119952 ||  || — || June 9, 2002 || Socorro || LINEAR || EOS || align=right | 3.7 km || 
|-id=953 bgcolor=#fefefe
| 119953 || 2002 ML || — || June 17, 2002 || Socorro || LINEAR || H || align=right | 1.5 km || 
|-id=954 bgcolor=#fefefe
| 119954 ||  || — || July 9, 2002 || Socorro || LINEAR || H || align=right | 1.2 km || 
|-id=955 bgcolor=#fefefe
| 119955 ||  || — || July 17, 2002 || Socorro || LINEAR || H || align=right | 1.2 km || 
|-id=956 bgcolor=#C2E0FF
| 119956 ||  || — || August 10, 2002 || Cerro Tololo || M. W. Buie || res4:7critical || align=right | 230 km || 
|-id=957 bgcolor=#fefefe
| 119957 ||  || — || September 5, 2002 || Socorro || LINEAR || FLO || align=right | 1.4 km || 
|-id=958 bgcolor=#fefefe
| 119958 ||  || — || September 7, 2002 || Socorro || LINEAR || — || align=right | 1.5 km || 
|-id=959 bgcolor=#fefefe
| 119959 ||  || — || September 26, 2002 || Palomar || NEAT || — || align=right | 1.5 km || 
|-id=960 bgcolor=#fefefe
| 119960 ||  || — || October 2, 2002 || Socorro || LINEAR || — || align=right | 1.4 km || 
|-id=961 bgcolor=#fefefe
| 119961 ||  || — || October 2, 2002 || Campo Imperatore || CINEOS || H || align=right | 1.2 km || 
|-id=962 bgcolor=#fefefe
| 119962 ||  || — || October 5, 2002 || Socorro || LINEAR || H || align=right | 1.4 km || 
|-id=963 bgcolor=#fefefe
| 119963 ||  || — || October 7, 2002 || Anderson Mesa || LONEOS || H || align=right | 1.2 km || 
|-id=964 bgcolor=#fefefe
| 119964 ||  || — || October 8, 2002 || Anderson Mesa || LONEOS || FLO || align=right | 1.4 km || 
|-id=965 bgcolor=#fefefe
| 119965 ||  || — || October 10, 2002 || Socorro || LINEAR || FLO || align=right | 1.5 km || 
|-id=966 bgcolor=#fefefe
| 119966 ||  || — || October 10, 2002 || Socorro || LINEAR || — || align=right | 1.3 km || 
|-id=967 bgcolor=#fefefe
| 119967 Daniellong ||  ||  || October 4, 2002 || Apache Point || SDSS || — || align=right | 1.5 km || 
|-id=968 bgcolor=#fefefe
| 119968 || 2002 UF || — || October 18, 2002 || Palomar || NEAT || — || align=right | 1.5 km || 
|-id=969 bgcolor=#fefefe
| 119969 ||  || — || October 30, 2002 || Kvistaberg || UDAS || FLO || align=right | 1.5 km || 
|-id=970 bgcolor=#fefefe
| 119970 ||  || — || November 5, 2002 || Socorro || LINEAR || — || align=right | 1.6 km || 
|-id=971 bgcolor=#fefefe
| 119971 ||  || — || November 7, 2002 || Socorro || LINEAR || FLO || align=right | 1.4 km || 
|-id=972 bgcolor=#fefefe
| 119972 ||  || — || November 14, 2002 || Socorro || LINEAR || — || align=right | 1.2 km || 
|-id=973 bgcolor=#fefefe
| 119973 ||  || — || November 11, 2002 || Socorro || LINEAR || FLO || align=right | 1.4 km || 
|-id=974 bgcolor=#fefefe
| 119974 ||  || — || November 15, 2002 || Socorro || LINEAR || H || align=right | 1.1 km || 
|-id=975 bgcolor=#fefefe
| 119975 ||  || — || November 15, 2002 || Socorro || LINEAR || H || align=right | 1.4 km || 
|-id=976 bgcolor=#C7FF8F
| 119976 ||  || — || November 7, 2002 || Kitt Peak || M. W. Buie || centaur || align=right | 24 km || 
|-id=977 bgcolor=#fefefe
| 119977 ||  || — || November 23, 2002 || Palomar || NEAT || V || align=right | 1.2 km || 
|-id=978 bgcolor=#fefefe
| 119978 ||  || — || November 24, 2002 || Palomar || NEAT || V || align=right | 1.4 km || 
|-id=979 bgcolor=#C2E0FF
| 119979 ||  || — || November 16, 2002 || Palomar || Palomar Obs. || twotinomoon || align=right | 509 km || 
|-id=980 bgcolor=#fefefe
| 119980 ||  || — || December 2, 2002 || Socorro || LINEAR || — || align=right | 1.3 km || 
|-id=981 bgcolor=#E9E9E9
| 119981 ||  || — || December 1, 2002 || Haleakala || NEAT || — || align=right | 1.9 km || 
|-id=982 bgcolor=#fefefe
| 119982 ||  || — || December 5, 2002 || Socorro || LINEAR || FLO || align=right | 1.5 km || 
|-id=983 bgcolor=#fefefe
| 119983 ||  || — || December 7, 2002 || Ondřejov || P. Kušnirák, P. Pravec || — || align=right | 1.5 km || 
|-id=984 bgcolor=#fefefe
| 119984 ||  || — || December 10, 2002 || Palomar || NEAT || — || align=right | 1.4 km || 
|-id=985 bgcolor=#fefefe
| 119985 ||  || — || December 10, 2002 || Socorro || LINEAR || — || align=right | 1.6 km || 
|-id=986 bgcolor=#fefefe
| 119986 ||  || — || December 10, 2002 || Socorro || LINEAR || — || align=right | 3.1 km || 
|-id=987 bgcolor=#E9E9E9
| 119987 ||  || — || December 10, 2002 || Socorro || LINEAR || — || align=right | 4.6 km || 
|-id=988 bgcolor=#E9E9E9
| 119988 ||  || — || December 11, 2002 || Socorro || LINEAR || — || align=right | 2.3 km || 
|-id=989 bgcolor=#fefefe
| 119989 ||  || — || December 11, 2002 || Socorro || LINEAR || — || align=right | 1.6 km || 
|-id=990 bgcolor=#fefefe
| 119990 ||  || — || December 11, 2002 || Socorro || LINEAR || FLO || align=right | 1.2 km || 
|-id=991 bgcolor=#fefefe
| 119991 ||  || — || December 11, 2002 || Socorro || LINEAR || — || align=right | 1.5 km || 
|-id=992 bgcolor=#E9E9E9
| 119992 ||  || — || December 12, 2002 || Palomar || NEAT || MAR || align=right | 2.7 km || 
|-id=993 bgcolor=#fefefe
| 119993 Acabá ||  ||  || December 5, 2002 || Kitt Peak || M. W. Buie || FLO || align=right | 1.5 km || 
|-id=994 bgcolor=#fefefe
| 119994 || 2002 YJ || — || December 27, 2002 || Anderson Mesa || LONEOS || — || align=right | 1.6 km || 
|-id=995 bgcolor=#fefefe
| 119995 || 2002 YU || — || December 27, 2002 || Anderson Mesa || LONEOS || V || align=right | 1.3 km || 
|-id=996 bgcolor=#fefefe
| 119996 ||  || — || December 27, 2002 || Anderson Mesa || LONEOS || FLO || align=right | 1.3 km || 
|-id=997 bgcolor=#fefefe
| 119997 ||  || — || December 28, 2002 || Kitt Peak || Spacewatch || — || align=right | 2.0 km || 
|-id=998 bgcolor=#fefefe
| 119998 ||  || — || December 28, 2002 || Anderson Mesa || LONEOS || — || align=right | 1.8 km || 
|-id=999 bgcolor=#fefefe
| 119999 ||  || — || December 28, 2002 || Anderson Mesa || LONEOS || FLO || align=right | 1.2 km || 
|-id=000 bgcolor=#fefefe
| 120000 ||  || — || December 31, 2002 || Socorro || LINEAR || — || align=right | 1.3 km || 
|}

References

External links 
 Discovery Circumstances: Numbered Minor Planets (115001)–(120000) (IAU Minor Planet Center)

0119